= Bartków =

Bartków may refer to:

- Bartków, Góra County in Lower Silesian Voivodeship (south-west Poland)
- Bartków, Oleśnica County in Lower Silesian Voivodeship (south-west Poland)
- Bartków, Świętokrzyskie Voivodeship (south-central Poland)
- Bartków, Masovian Voivodeship (east-central Poland)
- Stary Bartków
- Nowy Bartków

== See also ==
- Bartkowo
