= Church of the Ascension, Ciechanowiec =

Orthodox church in Ciechanowiec, Poland

Church of the Ascension
- Cerkiew Wniebowstąpienia Pańskiego
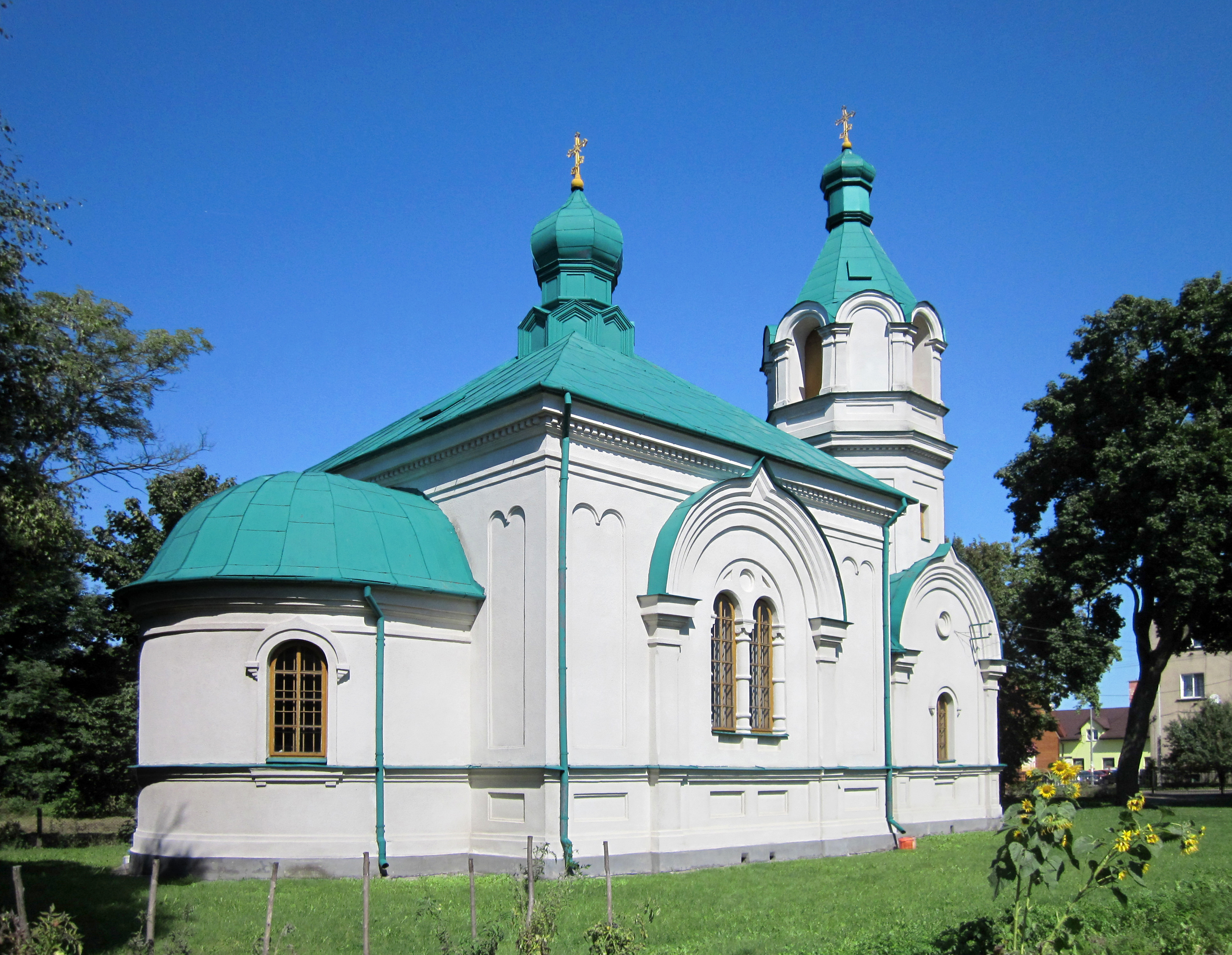
- Church of the Ascension
- 52°40′32.0″N 22°30′04.5″E
- Location: Ciechanowiec
- Country: Poland
- Denomination: Eastern Orthodoxy
- Churchmanship: Polish Orthodox Church

History
- Dedication: Ascension of Jesus
- Dedicated: May 22, 1877

Architecture
- Functional status: active Orthodox church
- Years built: 1873–1877

Specifications
- Materials: brick

Administration
- Diocese: Diocese of Warsaw and Bielsk

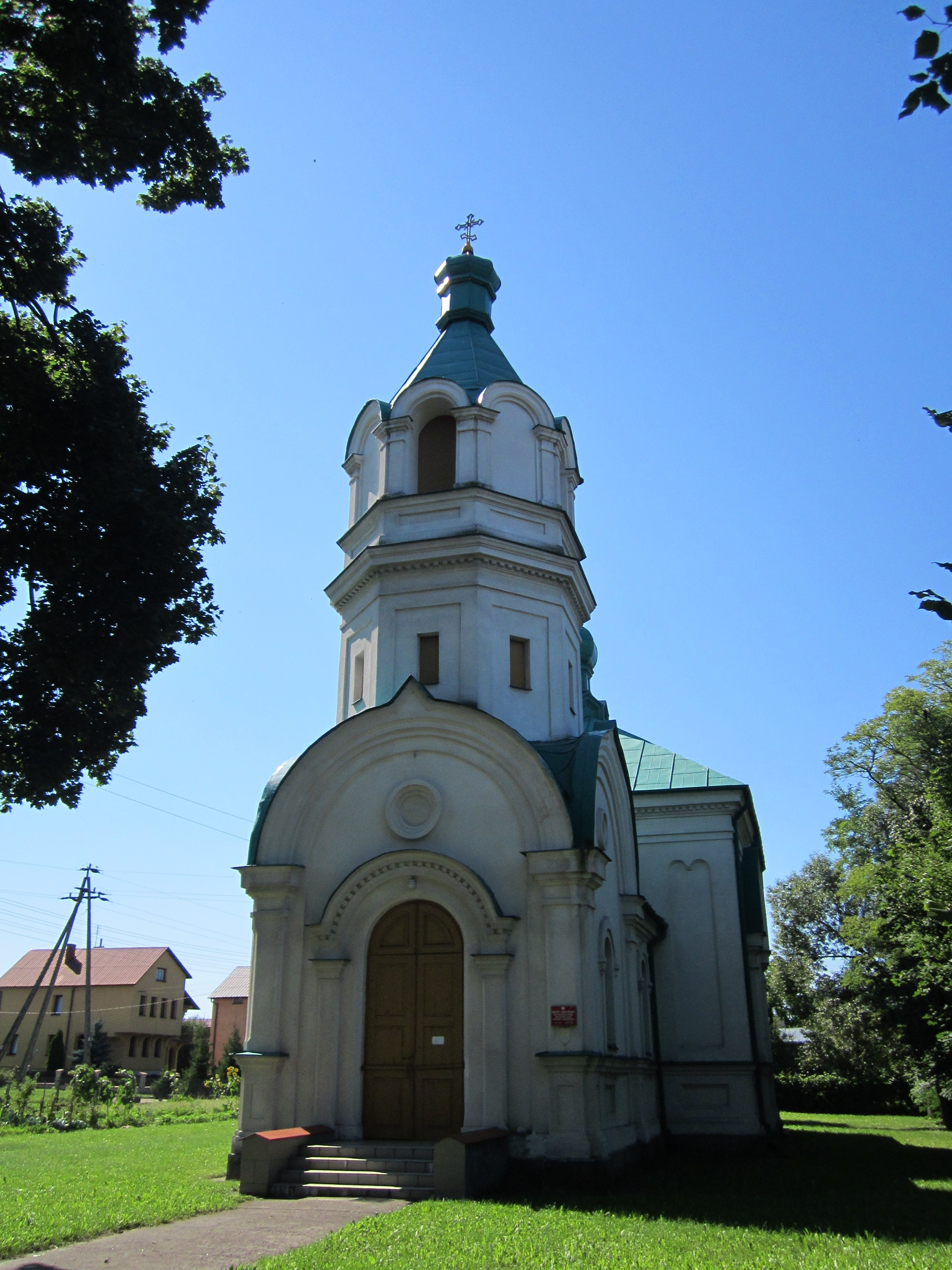
Front view of the church

The Church of the Ascension is a historic Orthodox church in Ciechanowiec. It is the main church of the parish of the same name, which belongs to the Siemiatycze deanery of the Diocese of Warsaw and Bielsk of the Polish Orthodox Church.

The Orthodox parish of St. George in Ciechanowiec, according to various sources, was established between the 14th and 16th centuries. After 1596, it accepted the provisions of the Union of Brest together with the entire Diocese of Volodymyr and Brest to which it belonged. The first church in Ciechanowiec existed until the mid-18th century when it was replaced by a new wooden church. In 1839, by the decision of the Synod of Polotsk, the church was taken over by the Russian Orthodox Church.

A brick sacred building was erected on the site of the older one in the 1870s. At the time of its dedication on 22 May 1877, the building was given the new dedication of the Ascension of the Lord. The church remained active until the departure of the Orthodox residents of Ciechanowiec during the mass evacuation during World War I. It remained abandoned for four years, and its furnishings were looted. It also suffered significant damage during World War II. The building was renovated in the 1950s and 1970s, saving it from complete ruin.

== History ==
=== First churches in Ciechanowiec ===
The exact date of the establishment of the Orthodox parish in Ciechanowiec is not definitively known. According to some sources, it existed as early as the 14th century, while others suggest it was founded two centuries later. Father Grzegorz Sosna, a researcher of the history of Orthodox parishes in Podlachia, indicated that a church in Ciechanowiec was active in the 15th century. Art historian Maria Kałamajska-Saeed believes that the Ciechanowiec parish, like all other nearby Orthodox parishes, was established between 15th and 16th century. Administratively, it belonged to the Eparchy of Volodymyr and Brest.

In the 17th century, the Ciechanowiec parish accepted the provisions of the Union of Brest, like the entire administration it belonged to. From this period, the existence of a freestanding Uniate church is documented. The patron of the building was St. George, and it was located at the current Tadeusz Kościuszko Street. In 1750, it was replaced by a new church built on a plot at the current Adam Mickiewicz Street. This was a single-nave, single-dome building with a bell tower. The church was located in the Ciechanowiec district inhabited by the Ruthenian population. A visitation protocol from 1789 recorded that 278 people attended it.

After the Third Partition of Poland, Ciechanowiec became part of New East Prussia. After the creation of the Uniate Diocese of Suprasl in this area, the Ciechanowiec parish fell under its jurisdiction and remained so until 1809. Then, a decree by Tsar Alexander I (two years earlier, New East Prussia was annexed to the Russian Empire by the Treaty of Tilsit) abolished the Diocese of Suprasl and re-incorporated its pastoral facilities into the Uniate Diocese of Volodymyr and Brest. The Ciechanowiec church remained Uniate until the Synod of Polotsk in 1839, when the Uniate Church in the Russian Empire was abolished (except for the Eparchy of Chełm–Belz, which functioned until its abolition in 1875), and its pastoral facilities were taken over by the Russian Orthodox Church. In 1847, the Ciechanowiec parish had 201 members.

=== Construction and operation of the brick church ===
Due to the poor technical condition of the 18th-century post-Uniate church, a tender for the construction of a brick church was announced in 1873 for the parish, which then numbered from 150 to 200 people from Ciechanowiec, Malec, Pełch, Bujenka, Kułaki, and Przybyszyn. The local parishioners sought to erect a new church on the site of the destroyed older building, and the investment was financed by the state treasury and private donors. The construction of the church lasted four years (according to another source, two). The dedication of the new sacred building took place on 22 May 1877, on the feast of the Ascension of the Lord, which became the patronal feast of the church. In the following years, the church's equipment was supplemented with additional elements.

In 1915, the Orthodox population of Ciechanowiec and its surroundings was evacuated deep into Russia. The abandoned church was adapted for secular purposes, and its furnishings were looted. Services resumed in the church from 1919, when Father Piotr Kuźmiuk, serving in the Church of the Protection of the Mother of God in Czarna Cerkiewna, took care of the building. Under his initiative, the church was cleaned, and its equipment was supplemented with essential items to replace those lost during the war. The Divine Liturgy was held once a month, attended by 168 people, including 79 from Ciechanowiec. The Ciechanowiec church was a branch of the parish in Czarna Cerkiewna.

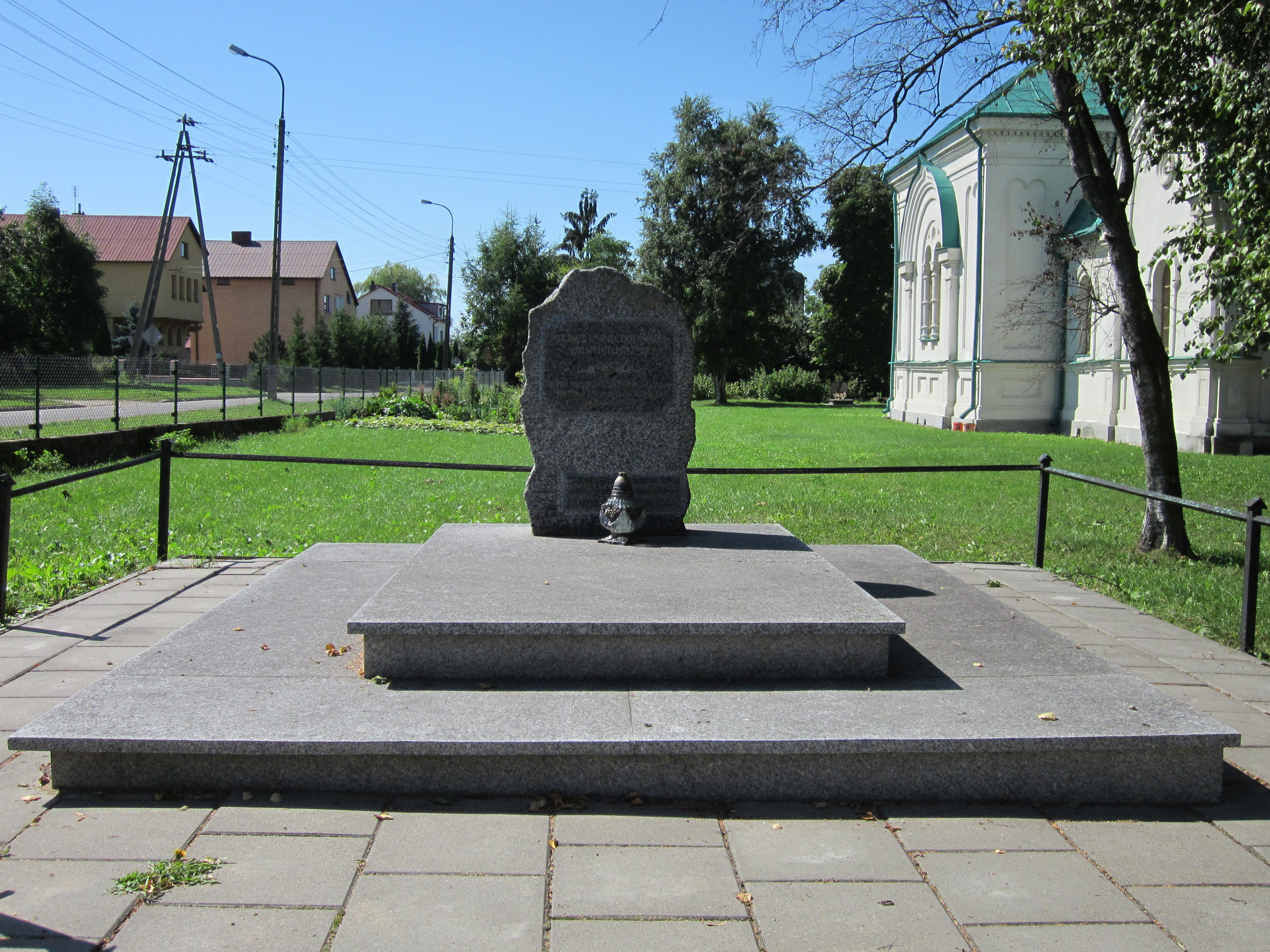
Memorial of Nazi executions at the church

The church suffered significant losses again during World War II, particularly during artillery shelling, which destroyed all its domes. According to eyewitness accounts, the German occupiers executed over 60 people of various nationalities in or near the church. In 1970, a monument commemorating them was unveiled on the church's grounds.

In 1951, the Ciechanowiec parish was reinstated, but this state lasted only two years. In 1953, the church lost its parish status again and became an auxiliary church of the parish in Siemiatycze. Thanks to a collect across the entire Diocese of Warsaw and Bielsk, a renovation of the damaged church was possible, during which the bell tower was rebuilt, the roof was covered with sheet metal, and plaster was applied. The four smaller domes over the church's nave were dismantled due to damage. Despite the renovation, by the 1970s, the building's technical condition was again assessed as threatening to ruin. Another major renovation took place between 1977 and 1980, thanks to the efforts of Father Grzegorz Sosna. During this time, a new iconostasis was made for the church by sculptor Wiaczesław Szum from Siemiatycze. Other liturgical utensils were also supplemented. The church was listed as a historical monument on 11 May 1981, under number A-138. A year later, the sacred building once again became a parish church.

== Architecture ==
The Church of the Ascension in Ciechanowiec is a brick structure that has been plastered. The main body of the building is constructed on a square plan and is divided into nine sections. Contrary to traditional Orthodox architectural customs, the church is not oriented; the entrance is through a church porch located on the eastern side, while the chancel is situated on the western side. An octagonal tower rises above the church porch, segmented with semicircular arcades in its upper part and topped with a tented roof crowned with an onion-shaped dome. A second dome of identical shape is positioned over the nave, capping a hip roof. Originally, the nave was topped with five domes (one in the center and four at the corners), but the side domes were destroyed during World War II and were not restored due to a lack of funds. The roof over the church porch is gabled. Significant pointed arcades are visible on the walls of both the church porch and the main body of the church.

== Bibliography ==
- Kałamajska-Saeed, Maria, ed. (1986). Katalog zabytków sztuki w Polsce. Województwo łomżyńskie, Ciechanowiec, Zambrów, Wysokie Mazowieckie i okolice (in Polish). Warsaw: Instytut Sztuki Polskiej Akademii Nauk. ISBN 83-221-0306-9.
