= Malec =

Malec may refer to:

== Places ==
=== Czech Republic ===
- Maleč, a municipality and village in the Vysočina Region
- Maleč, a village and part of Strašín in the Plzeň Region

=== Poland ===
- Malec, Lesser Poland Voivodeship (south Poland)
- Małec, Lesser Poland Voivodeship (south Poland)
- Malec, Podlaskie Voivodeship (north-east Poland)

== People ==
- Malec (surname)
