= Władysław Łukasiuk =

Polish army captain (1906–1949)

Władysław Łukasiuk, nom de guerre Młot or Młot II
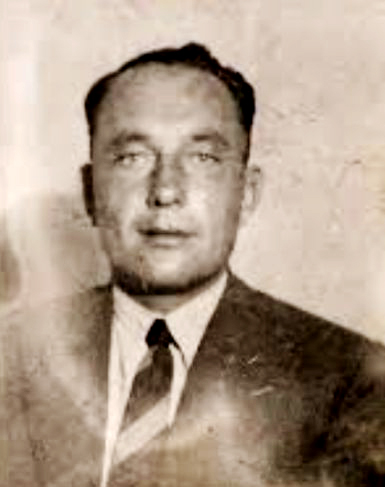
- Władysław Łukasiuk before 1939
- Born: 16 February 1906; Tokary
- Died: 27 June 1949 (aged 43); Czaje-Wólka, Polish People's Republic
- Cause of death: Gunshot wound
- Occupations: Captain, Partisan, Farmer

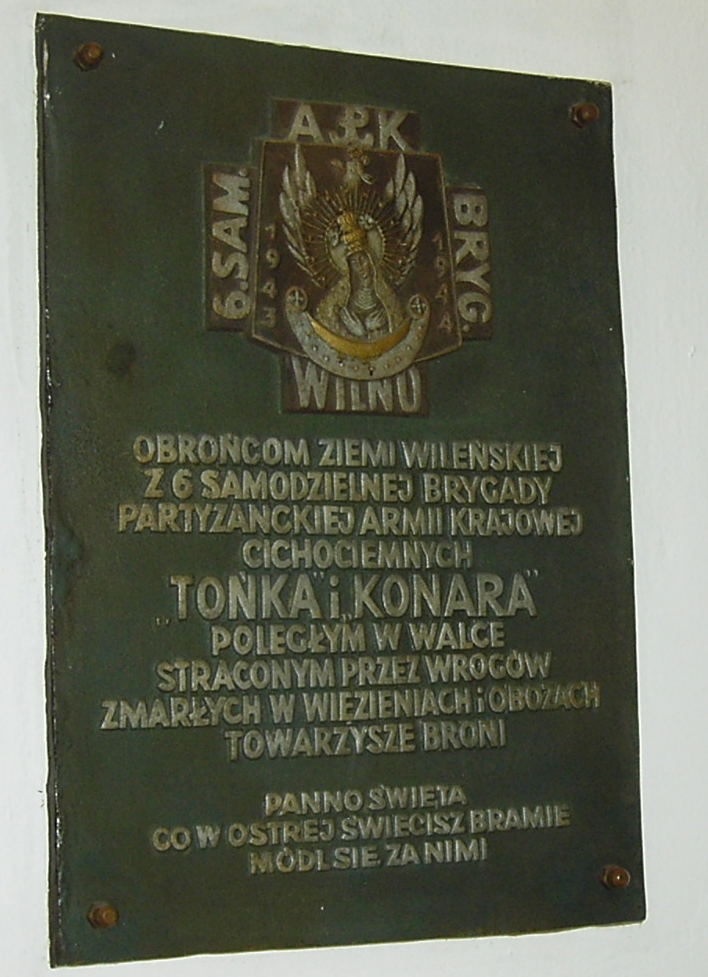
A commemorative plaque for the 6th Wilno Brigade, led for a time by Władysław Łukasiuk

Władysław Łukasiuk (16 February 1906 - 27 June 1949) (nom de guerre "Młot" or "Młot II" - "The Hammer" or "Hammer II") was a captain of the Polish Army, of the Home Army (AK), and the anti-communist underground.

== Early life ==
He was born in Tokary to a peasant family where he finished elementary and high school. In 1929 he joined the military where he quickly advanced to the rank of platoon commander. However his official military career was cut short by an accident incurred when he was riding a horse. His left leg was paralyzed and he was released from the army.

He married Jadwiga Oksiutówna and settled in Mężenin on the Bug River where he had three children. Until the outbreak of World War II he served as the deputy Wójt (mayor) of Sarnaki and ran the village store. Some historians have speculated that he was involved in Polish military intelligence services at the time, in particular, gathering intelligence on the Polish communist Wanda Wasilewska, whom he knew personally.

== Against the Nazis ==
Because of his injury he did not take part in the Invasion of Poland; however, he soon joined the anti-Nazi underground as part of the ZWZ and AK. He took part in the recovery of the German V2 rockets which were being tested in Poland, and their shipment to Great Britain. His unit also took part in several skirmishes with the Germans and other military actions, including the blowing up of the rail bridge on the Siedlce-Czeremha rail line However, as far as it is known, Łukasiuk did not participate in Operation Tempest because the front moved past the region he was operating in. Subsequently a plan was formed to unite all the local AK groupings and march to Warsaw to help in the Warsaw Uprising. Due to arrests and persecution of AK members by the Soviets however, the plan was not realized. After the NKVD carried out arrests and repression against the local population (including the arrest and deportation to the gulags of Władysław's brother-in-law) he decided to join the anti-communist resistance and formed a partisan unit.

== Against the communists ==
During the first few months in the new underground, Młot's unit included four or five regular members, as well as part-time demobilized AK soldiers who remained under his orders. Few specifics are known about his actions during this period but it is known that the unit managed to stock pile an impressive arsenal of weapons out of what they brought with them from AK, from Allies' drops to the partisans and from arms left over after the front passed. In the winter of 1944/45, still as a corporal he established contact with the Bialystok region AK command. In January 1945 he enlarged his partisan unit to a few dozen soldiers. Soon after, his group in their first skirmish with the Soviets defeated and broke up a NKVD operational group near Mężenin. Subsequently his partisans were incorporated into the much larger partisan unit of Teodor Śmiałkowski, "Szumny". His platoon distinguished itself with its battle readiness and courage. During this time, Łukasiuk took part in an underground military courses and was advanced to the rank of first lieutenant, and eventually captain.

In September 1945 "Szumny" was killed and his unit disbanded. The platoon headed by Łukasiuk decided to continue fighting against the new communist authority joined the 5th Vilnian Home Army brigade and fought several skirmishes at Skiory, Zalesie, and Miodusy Pokrzywne. After the demobilization of the brigade, still wishing to continue fighting, he came under the command of Zygmunt Szendzielarz "Łupaszka". Soon the Szendzielarz brigade moved from the left bank of the Bug river to the region of Sokołów Podlaski where, in October 1945 "Młot" was made the commander of the 6th Vilnian Brigade. He was to lead it for the next three years, ably leading it in the field, escaping numerous attempts at capture by the communists authorities and carrying it through even the most difficult of circumstances. At one point a reward of 100,000 zlotych was established by the UB for information leading to his capture.

During this time the UB arrested Łukasiuk's sister, Maria Sobolewska, after she was reported to the communist authorities by a neighbor. While arrested, she was tortured and beaten for three months but did not reveal any information about the whereabouts of her brother and refused to cooperate with the communist secret police. In 1945 she was tried for "treason against the People's Republic of Poland" and sentenced to ten years in prison, of which she served six. Because the UB knew that Łukasiuk was lame in the left leg, they resorted to arresting and torturing random people with the same handicap in the region in the hopes of catching him by accident.

== Death ==
The official version of the communist government was that Władysław Łukasiuk "Młot" died during a short vacation from fighting in the village of Czaje-Wólka in June 1947. He was shot by one of his deputies, Czesław Dybowski, "Rejtan", because Łukasiuk had just executed Czesław's younger brother Leopold for disobeying orders (Leopold did not carry out the execution of an alleged member of the communists Polish secret police). After Czesław shot Lukasiuk he took his younger brother to the doctor. Leopold died soon, due to gangrene. The communist secret police dug up Lukasiuk's and Leopold's body and moved them to an unknown location.

== Character and legacy ==
Władysław Łukasiuk was respected by his men for his personal courage and partisan skills. Even though he had trouble moving about due to his paralyzed leg, he would always march at the head of his unit, using his SWT-40 carbine as a crutch (even though the unit possessed several wagons for transport). He was characterized by his careful and respectful approach to the civilian population of the area, regardless of their ethnicity, class or religion and on many occasions responded to appeals from locals to combat common bandits and thieves who were plentiful in the post-war chaos. This, in addition to his continued struggle against first the Nazis and then the repressive communist authorities, made "Młot" a legend of Podlasie in his lifetime. During the communist era in Poland, however, he was officially vilified and defamed.

On 11 November 2007, the president of Poland Lech Kaczyński posthumously awarded Władysław Łukasiuk the Grand Cross of Polonia Restituta.
