= Zales (disambiguation) =

Zales is an American jewelry retailer.

Zales may also refer to:

- Zales, Bloke, a settlement in Slovenia
- Zaleś, Siedlce County, a village in Poland
- Zaleś, Sokołów County, a village in Poland
