= Kobusy, Podlaskie Voivodeship =

Kobusy
- Village
- Location within Poland
- Coordinates: 52°41′21″N 22°38′30″E
- Country: Poland
- Voivodeship: Podlaskie
- County: Wysokie Mazowieckie
- Gmina: Ciechanowiec
- Population: 110

Kobusy [kɔˈbusɨ] is a village in the administrative district of Gmina Ciechanowiec, within Wysokie Mazowieckie County, Podlaskie Voivodeship, in north-eastern Poland. The village lies approximately 10 km (6 mi) east of Ciechanowiec, 27 km (17 mi) south of Wysokie Mazowieckie, and 60 km (37 mi) south-west of the regional capital Białystok.
