= Laskowice =

Laskowice may refer to the following places:

- Laskowice, Kuyavian-Pomeranian Voivodeship (north-central Poland)
- Laskowice, Masovian Voivodeship (east-central Poland)
- Laskowice, Kluczbork County in Opole Voivodeship (south-west Poland)
- Laskowice, Nysa County in Opole Voivodeship (south-west Poland)
- Laskowice, Prudnik County in Opole Voivodeship (south-west Poland)
- Jelcz-Laskowice in Lower Silesian Voivodeship (south-west Poland)
- Laskowice, Pomeranian Voivodeship (north Poland)
