= Church of the Intercession of the Theotokos, Czarna Cerkiewna =

Orthodox church in Czarna Cerkiewna, Poland

Church of the Intercession of the Theotokos
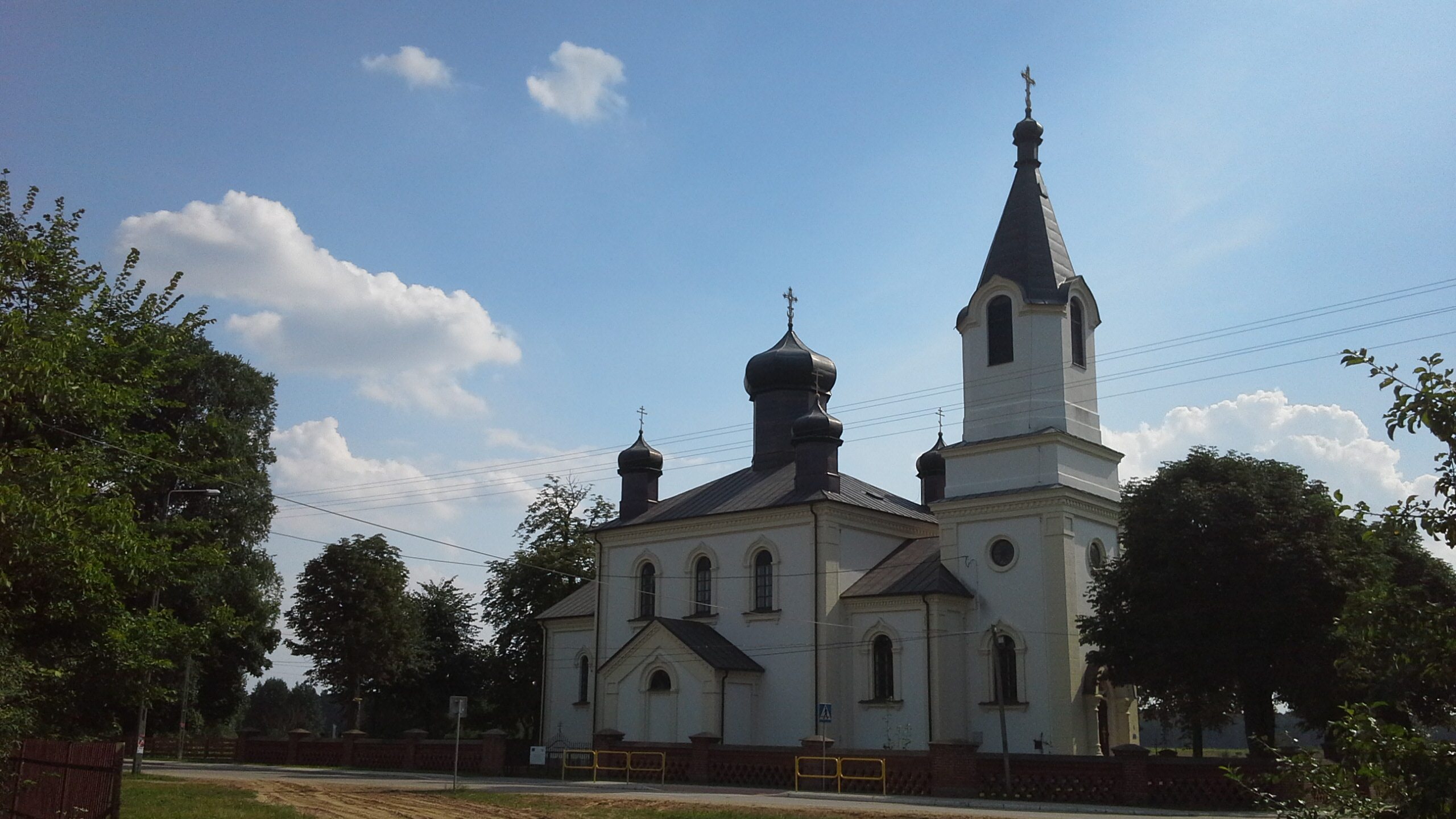
- General view of the church
- Church of the Intercession of the Theotokos
- 52°36′45.5″N 22°47′37.5″E
- Location: Czarna Cerkiewna
- Country: Poland
- Denomination: Eastern Orthodoxy
- Churchmanship: Polish Orthodox Church

History
- Status: active Orthodox church
- Dedication: Intercession of the Theotokos
- Dedicated: December 10, 1901

Architecture
- Style: Russian Revival
- Completed: 1901

Specifications
- Materials: brick

Administration
- Diocese: Diocese of Warsaw and Bielsk

The Church of the Intercession of the Theotokos is an Orthodox church and parish church in Czarna Cerkiewna, Poland. It belongs to the Siemiatycze Deanery of the Diocese of Warsaw and Bielsk within the Polish Orthodox Church.

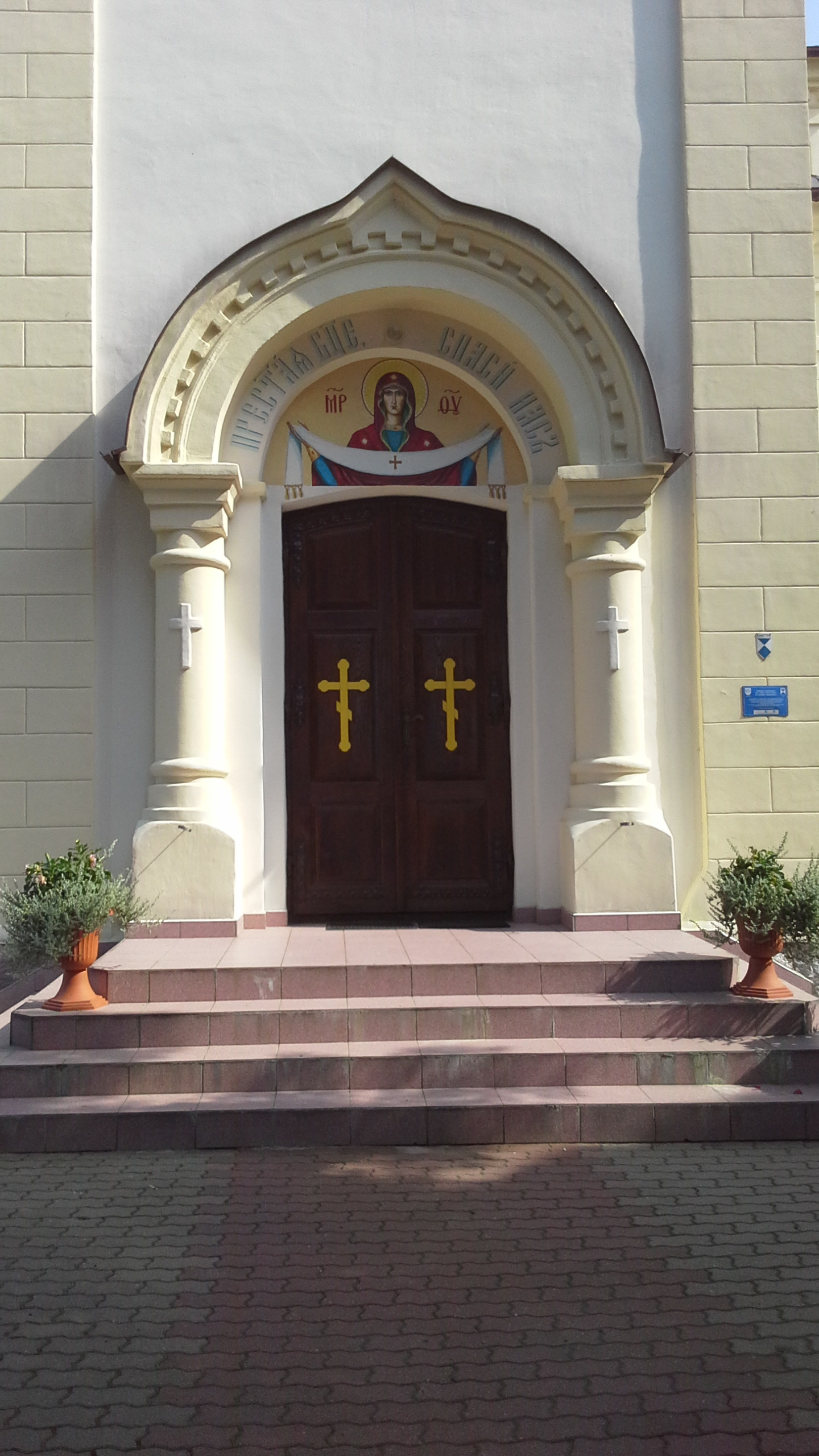
Entrance with the patronal icon

The first Orthodox church in Czarna Cerkiewna (then called Czarna Mała) is mentioned in 1555 – a wooden, single-domed structure. The local parish adopted the Union of Brest by 1626 at the latest. Around 1676 or 1733, a new wooden church with a bell tower replaced the original. In 1839, under the Synod of Polotsk, it joined the Russian Orthodox Church. Over the next five years, its interior was adapted for Orthodox liturgy, notably with an iconostasis installed in 1844, though many Greek Catholic items remained. Despite 19th-century repairs, its poor condition led to a decision in 1890 to build a brick church in the Russian Revival style. Construction began a decade later, and the new church was consecrated in 1901. It has remained active since, except during 1915–1918, when most Orthodox residents were on mass exile. The church has consistently held parish status and was thoroughly renovated at the turn of the 20th and 21st centuries.

Located along the village's main road in its northern part, the church grounds are enclosed by a brick-and-iron fence with a gate, featuring votive crosses and 20th-century gravestones, including symbolic ones.

== History ==
=== First Orthodox church ===
The earliest record of Czarna Mała (later Czarna Cerkiewna), granted to Pretor of Korczew by Sigismund Kęstutaitis, dates to 1434, but a wooden Orthodox parish church is first noted in 1555. Orthodox sources claim 19th-century archaeological findings at a site called Cerkwisko – about 1 km (0.62 mi) northeast of Czarna Cerkiewna – suggest an 11th-century settlement with a church, bell tower, and cemetery, though this is not mentioned in the Catalog of Art Monuments in Poland. In 1574, Barbara Kiszczyna, Podlachian voivode's wife, endowed the parish (possibly expanding an existing grant). The church's formal adoption of the Union of Brest is undated but occurred before 1626 within the Eparchy of Vladimir and Brest, which accepted the union in 1596 under Bishop Hypatius Pociej. Acceptance in the region was gradual. A 1626 canonical visitation report Latinized its dedication as Protekcji Najswiętrzey Panny and described it as small, fenced, with one small dome and four windows.

=== Greek Catholic church ===
The second church, also wooden, was Greek Catholic, funded by Maksymilian Franciszek Ossoliński, Drohiczyn standard-bearer and Podlachian huntsman, then village owner, or possibly Count Jan Stanisław Ossoliński. Built after 1676 or in 1733 (per a lost Latin inscription), a 1757 visitation described it as structurally sound but needing repairs, especially to its recent roof and walls. It had a bell tower over the entrance and a separate one by the churchyard cemetery, serving 611 people.

Until 1797, the parish was part of the Greek Catholic Eparchy of Volodymyr–Brest. From 1797 to 1807, it joined the Drohiczyn Deanery of the Diocese of Surpaśl, then the Vilnius Metropolitan Greek Catholic Diocese's Drohiczyn Deanery, and from 1838, the Bielsk Deanery.

Renovated in 1802, it had 552 attendees in 1838, with 425 deemed active (confessing and receiving Eucharist during Lent).

In the 1830s, the Vilnius consistory removed Latin elements introduced after the Synod of Zamość, replacing them with Russian Orthodox liturgical items to prepare for conversion. In Czarna Cerkiewna, this was incomplete. Deemed one of the deanery's poorest in 1834, it received a synodal moleben book in 1835 (adding to an older Slavonic one). In 1836, an Orthodox altar and offertory table were installed. By 1837, a wooden iconostasis structure had also been placed inside the church, but due to the lack of financial support from Count Ossoliński, the benefactor of the parish, work on the icons was never undertaken. Ossoliński's reluctance to fund changes in the church and purchase new liturgical items meant that the further de-Latinization planned by the metropolitan consistory could not be carried out as intended. The Drohiczyn dean informed the diocesan authorities of the situation and requested assistance. Until the de-Latinization efforts, the church did not have an iconostasis at all; instead, icons were arranged in a row on one of the walls to resemble the row of an iconostasis, with additional images placed above them in a sequence that did not correspond to the traditional iconographic order. However, in 1837, the pulpit introduced after the Synod of Zamość was removed from the church.

In 1838, the district chief, Medvedev, gave a negative assessment of the progress of de-Latinization in the Drohiczyn County. He listed the church in Czarna Cerkiewna among those that still retained Latin elements, which he deemed unacceptable. Medvedev also accused the local priest of conducting services that did not conform to the synodal rite, which Uniate clergy had been required to follow upon receiving Russian liturgical books. The dean defended the priest, arguing that he was simply not yet sufficiently proficient in the recently introduced rite but did not oppose the implemented changes.

On 14 June 1838, a district clergy assembly was held at the church in Czarna Cerkiewna, where Drohiczyn dean Adam Kostycewicz informed the priests that they were required to submit declarations of readiness to convert to Orthodoxy. He also stated that clergy unprepared to conduct Orthodox services would be sent for additional training at the Zhyrovichy Monastery and, if they failed to make progress, would not be allowed to continue their priestly service. The parish priest of Czarna Cerkiewna had already submitted his declaration in December 1837.

=== Orthodox church after 1839 ===
In 1839, per the Synod of Polotsk, the parish joined the Diocese of Lithuania of the Russian Orthodox Church with all Greek Catholic parishes in Podlachia.

Post-conversion, 18th-century Greek Catholic items remained, with some Orthodox utensils added later. In November 1840, Father Piotr Baranowski reported the lack of a darochranitielnica and warm-water vessel, a problem shared with churches in Ciechanowiec and Koryciny. The Vilnius consistory, under Bishop Joseph Semashko, provided these free of charge. Adaptation for Orthodox liturgy concluded in 1844 with the iconostasis completed.

Repairs in 1853 reinforced the structure, the roof was re-shingled in 1869, a new iconostasis installed in 1875, and a brick fence added in 1884. By the late 19th century, it held a 57-volume library.

==== Brick church ====
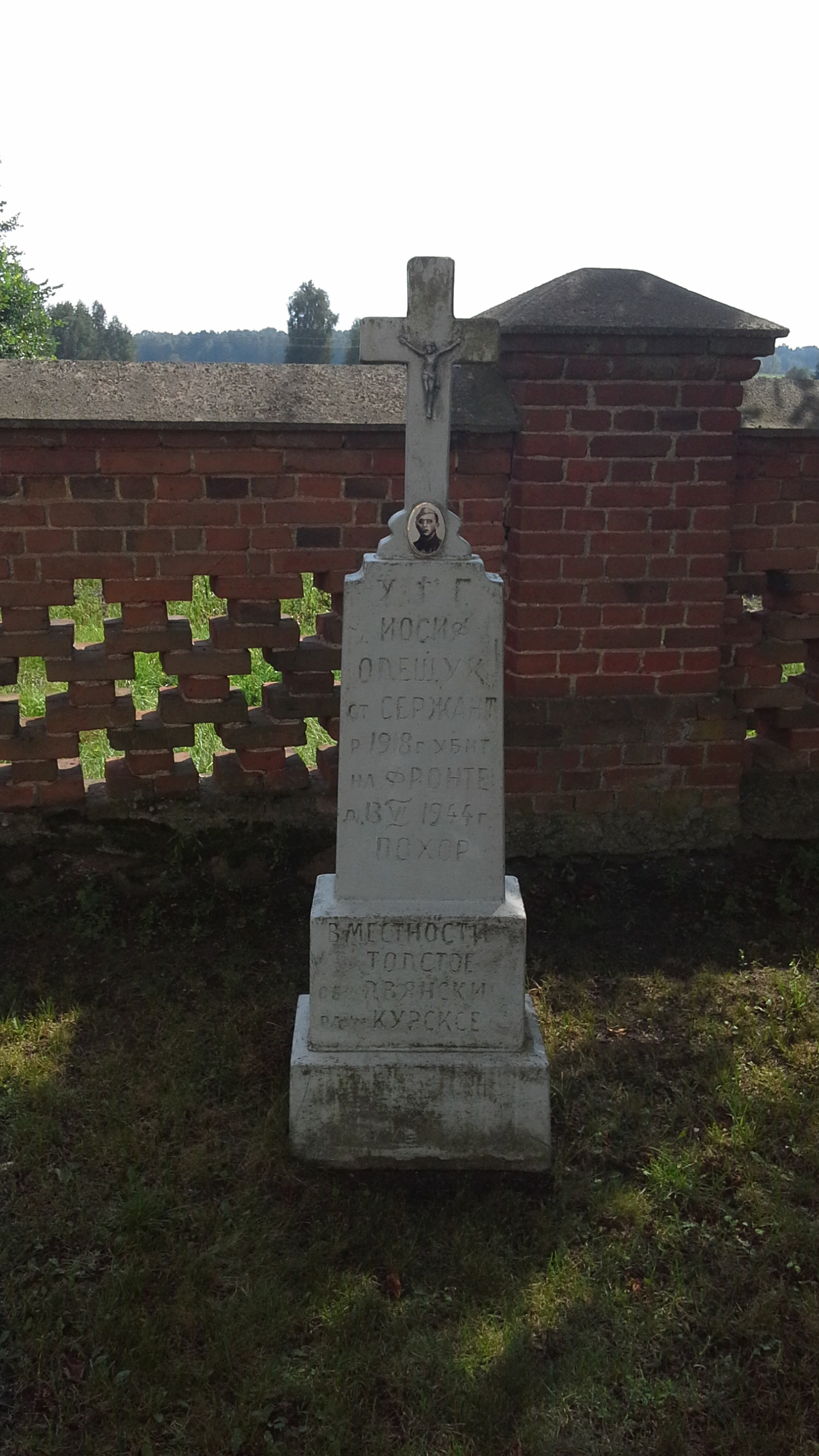
Symbolic gravestone of a parishioner killed in World War II

The 1733 church, despite repairs, was dilapidated by the late 19th century, prompting its demolition. A brick church, designed after Konstantin Thon's pattern, was approved in 1890 but built starting in 1900. It was dedicated on 10 December 1901.

In 1900, the parish joined the Drohiczyn Deanery of the new Eparchy of Grodno and Volkovysk, with 1,150 members. Numbers declined before World War I due to emigration.

In 1915, most Orthodox residents fled on mass exile, returning between 1918 and 1920.

In the Second Polish Republic, the parish grew to 2,600, incorporating filial churches in Ciechanowiec, Żurobice, Andryjanki, Grodzisk, and Brańsk. Initially in the Bielsk Deanery, it moved to the Siemiatycze Deanery of the Eparchy of Grodno and Volkovysk in 1924, then to the Diocese of Warsaw and Bielsk in 1951. That year, Grodzisk and Ciechanowiec regained parish status, while Żurobice, Andryjanki, and Brańsk became filial elsewhere. In the late 1960s to early 1970s, attendance was estimated at 700 (church data) or 489 (clergy survey of active members).

Renovations in the 1990s replaced the domes in 1995, refurbished the interior in 1996, and restored the facade and roof in 2011. It was listed in the register of historic monuments on 30 July 1998 under number A-841. By the early 21st century, the parish had over 300 members.

== Architecture ==
=== Structure ===
The brick church features a square main nave, flanked by narrower, lower rectangular annexes to the north and south. The chancel and church porch are also rectangular, with a four-story tower before the church porch, its top corners chamfered and capped by a tented roof with a small onion dome. The portal entrance has engaged columns and a archivolt with a kokoshnik arch. Facade corners are rusticated with a cornice and dentil frieze. Roofs are gabled (four-pitched over the nave) and metal-clad, with five onion-domed turrets above the chancel. Semicircular windows are framed by paired pilasters with kokoshnik arches.

Nearby are votive crosses and 20th-century gravestones, some symbolic, honoring parishioners killed in World War II or deceased post-war.

=== Interior ===
The eclectic iconostasis, crafted in 1901 by Dienisov's workshop, features Neo-Renaissance icons. Two 18th-century Greek Catholic side altars, partially adapted post-conversion, remain. The right altar holds a Baroque icon of Saints Methodius and a Moscow-made early 20th-century icon of Saints Peter and Paul; the left has a Baroque Saint Cyril and an 1860 Protection of the Mother of God icon. A feretron from the 18th century, repainted in the 20th, features Trinity and Protection icons with acanthus framing. A mid-19th-century folk feretron also depicts the Trinity and Virgin Mary. A late 18th/early 19th-century image of Christ at the Column and a mid-19th-century icon of the Virgin with Anthony of Kiev and Sergius of Radonezh were added post-conversion.

Two altar crosses include a late 19th-century plated one with an enameled crucifix and Evangelist plaques, and an 1892 silver Moscow-made cross with a circular glory, depicting the Virgin, John the Theologian, and God the Father. A Baroque chalice from the late 18th/early 19th century survives from the Greek Catholic era.

Items stored in the tower include a damaged early 18th-century folk Christ sculpture from a larger crucifix, 18th-century Baroque altar ear fragments with acanthus motifs, an early 19th-century monstrance with grape and wheat designs (fitted with a 20th-century Christ Risen plaque), and a 1743 Rococo pax by Adam Juchanowitz the Elder of Gdańsk.

== Bibliography ==
- Matus, I. (2013). Schyłek unii i proces restytucji prawosławia w obwodzie białostockim w latach 30. XIX wieku [The Decline of the Union and the Process of Restoring Orthodoxy in the Białystok Land in the 1830s] (in Polish). Białystok: University of Białystok Publishing House. ISBN 978-83-7431-364-3.
