= Jan Krzysztof Kluk =

Polish entomologist (1739–1796)

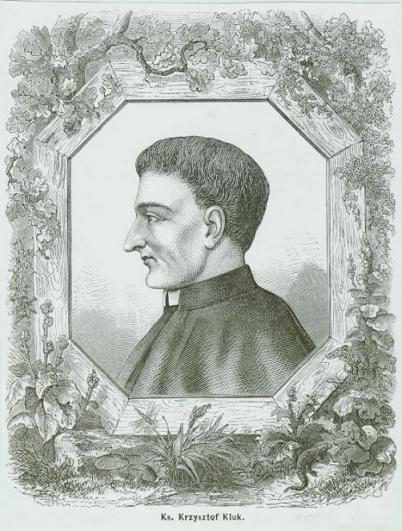
Jan Krzysztof Kluk

Jan Krzysztof Kluk (September 13, 1739, Ciechanowiec – July 2, 1796) was a Polish naturalist agronomist and entomologist.

He was the son of Jan Krzysztof Adrian and Marianna Elżbieta. His father, an impoverished nobleman, was a building contractor and architect, mainly of churches. Jan Krzysztof Kluk went to school in Warsaw, later in Drohiczyn, and finally in the Piarists school in Łuków. In 1763 he finished the Missionary seminary in the Holy Cross Church, Warsaw. From 1763–67 he was a domestic chaplain attached to the noble household of Tomasz Ossoliński, the starosta of Nur. From 1767–70 he was vicar of the parish of Winna-Poświętna. He later became vicar of the parish of Ciechanowiec, a position he kept until his death.

He was a man with universal interests, but known mostly as a naturalist studying mainly the regions of Podlaskie and Masovia. He was a very able draftsman and engraver, which permitted him to illustrate his own later works.

Princess Anna Jabłonowska gave him access to the great library and natural science collections in her palace of Siemiatycze. Many of his published works were breakthroughs in contemporary Polish natural science and agriculture.

He spent most of his life in Ciechanowiec where he died. He was a Catholic priest, and vicar of Ciechanowiec. Kluk described several taxa of Lepidoptera including the Holarctic Nymphalis, the South American genus Heliconius, and the genus Danaus in which is placed the monarch.

There is a Krzysztof Kluk Museum of Agriculture in Ciechanowiec.

== Works ==
He wrote a multi-volume work Zwierząt domowych i dzikich, osobliwie krajowych historii naturalnej początki i gospodarstwo (in English The natural history of domestic and (Polish) wild animals and of farm animals) published in Warsaw in 1780. Another notable Kluk work was the three volumes entitled Dykcjonarz roślinny… (English: The Dictionary of Plants), published from 1786 to 1788 in Warsaw (volume I – 1786, volume II – 1787, volume III – 1788). The Dictionary contains entries in Latin alphabetical order that comprise 1 536 species of plants of Polish and foreign origin. Importantly, not only Latin but also Polish names were given.

== Publications about Jan Krzysztof Kluk ==
Prof. Gabriel Brzęk wrote several biographical books about Jan Krzysztof Kluk:

- Krzysztof Kluk jako szermierz postępowych idei społecznych polskiego Oświecenia (1958)
- Krzysztof Kluk (1739–1796) jako przyrodnik polskiego oświecenia (1973)
- Krzysztof Kluk (1977)

== See also ==
- List of Roman Catholic scientist-clerics
