= Łempice, Wysokie Mazowieckie County =

Łempice
- Village
- Location within Poland
- Coordinates: 52°41′17″N 22°39′20″E
- Country: Poland
- Voivodeship: Podlaskie
- County: Wysokie Mazowieckie
- Gmina: Ciechanowiec

Population
  - Total: 200
- Postal code: 18-230
- Vehicle registration: BWM

Łempice [wɛmˈpit͡sɛ] is a village in the administrative district of Gmina Ciechanowiec, within Wysokie Mazowieckie County, Podlaskie Voivodeship, in north-eastern Poland.

Four Polish citizens were murdered by Nazi Germany in the village during World War II.
