= Mogielnica, Siedlce County =

Mogielnica
- Village
- Location within Poland
- Coordinates: 52°23′33″N 22°34′30″E
- Country: Poland
- Voivodeship: Masovian
- County: Siedlce
- Gmina: Korczew
- Population: 70

Mogielnica [mɔɡʲɛlˈnit͡sa] is a village in the administrative district of Gmina Korczew, within Siedlce County, Masovian Voivodeship, in east-central Poland.
