= Winna-Wypychy =

- Village
- Location within Poland
- Coordinates: 52°40′53″N 22°33′31″E
- Country: Poland
- Voivodeship: Podlaskie
- County: Wysokie Mazowieckie
- Gmina: Ciechanowiec
- Population: 90

Winna-Wypychy [ˈvinna vɨˈpɨxɨ] is a village in the administrative district of Gmina Ciechanowiec, within Wysokie Mazowieckie County, Podlaskie Voivodeship, in north-eastern Poland.
