= Ivan Solonevich =

Soviet intellectual (1891–1953)

- Born: Ivan Lukyanovich Solonevich; Иван Лукьянович Солоневич; 13 November 1891; Ciechanowiec (now Poland, then Imperial Russia)
- Died: 24 April 1953 (aged 61); Montevideo, Uruguay
- Occupations: writer, historian, publicist, journalist, editor

Ivan Lukyanovich Solonevich (Russian: Ива́н Лукья́нович Солоне́вич, 13 November 1891 — 24 April 1953) was a Russian philosopher, historian, writer, editor, publisher, publicist and conservative political activist.

A member of the White movement during the Russian Civil War and later of the anti-Soviet underground in Ukraine, Solonevich was persecuted and jailed. He spent 1920s and early 1930s as a sports official, photographer and journalist, all the while looking for the opportunity to leave the country. After several failed attempts he finally succeeded in 1934 and spent the rest of his life in emigration, first in Finland, then Bulgaria, Germany, Argentina (where he founded the newspaper Nasha Strana, Our Country) and Uruguay.

In September 1932, the Solonevichs attempted to escape from the Soviet Union through Karelia. Due to a serious illness, Solonevich had to give up escaping.

The second attempt at a group escape from the USSR, prepared in May 1933, failed due to appendicitis of his son Yuri.

Four months later, in September 1933, Solonevich made a third attempt at a group escape from the Soviet Union, but due to the participation of an NKVD informant in the group, the entire group was arrested. For attempting to escape, Ivan Solonevich, his brother Boris and Ivan’s son Yuri were accused of organizing a counter-revolutionary community, campaigning against Soviet power, espionage and preparing to escape abroad. Ivan and Boris were sentenced to labor in the Gulag camps for 8 years, and Ivan’s son Yuri was sentenced to 3 years.

Solonevich made his fourth attempt to escape on July 28, 1934 from imprisonment in a BBK labor camp of the White Sea-Baltic Canal and, together with his son Yuri, successfully crossed the Finnish border.

The escape of the Solonevichs caused a great resonance among the Russian emigration. Concerned about the possible consequences of the Solonevichs' anti-Soviet activities in emigration, NKVD officers began active work to discredit the brothers. In 1936, the Solonevichs received visas and left for Bulgaria.

At the beginning of 1937, the NKVD began preparations for the elimination of Ivan Solonevich. In February 1938, Solonevich's wife Tamara and his secretary, were killed by an assassin's bomb, likely intended for Solonevich. After the death of his wife Tamara due to the threat of new assassination attempts, Ivan Solonevich received a visa to Germany and in March 1938 he and his son left Bulgaria.

Ivan Lukyanovich Solonevich was rehabilitated in the Soviet Union on July 20, 1989 by the military prosecutor's office of the Leningrad Military District.

Solonevich authored several acclaimed books on Russian monarchy (The Assassins of the Tzar, 1938; The Myth about Nicholas the Second, 1949) and political repressions in the USSR (Russia in Concentration Camp, 1935). His best-known work is People's Monarchy (1951) in which he fully developed his doctrine of monarchy being the only viable and historically justified political system for Russia.

== Bibliography ==
=== Translations ===
- Die Verlorenen. — 5. Auf. — Essen: Essener-Verlag, 1937. (German)
- The Soviet Paradise Lost. Translated by Harrow, Warren. New York: Paisley Press, Incorporated, 1938. (English)
- Russia in Chains: A Record of Unspeakable Suffering. Translated by Harrow, Warren. London: Williams and Norgate Ltd, 1938. (English)
- Het "proletarische" paradijs Russland een concentratiekampf. — Den Haag: W. P. Van *Stockum & Zoon N. V, 1937. (Dutch)
- Rosja w obozie koncentracyjnym. — Lwow: Nakladem Sekretariatu *Porozumiewawczego Polsckich Organizacyi Spolecznych we Lwowie, 1938. (Polish)
- Rusko za mřížemi — Praha: Prapor Ruska, 1936. (Czech)
- Russija u konclogoru / Urednik dr. J. Adric. — Zagreb: Knjiznica dobrich romana, 1937.
- Иван Солоњевич. Народна монархиjа/Превод Зоран Буљīuћ. – Београд: Центар за изучавање Традициjе «Укрониjа», 2014 (Serbo-Croatian)
