= Wojtkowice-Dady =

- Village
- Location within Poland
- Coordinates: 52°36′57″N 22°25′51″E
- Country: Poland
- Voivodeship: Podlaskie
- County: Wysokie Mazowieckie
- Gmina: Ciechanowiec
- Population: 90

Wojtkowice-Dady [vɔi̯tkɔˈvit͡sɛ ˈdadɨ] is a village in the administrative district of Gmina Ciechanowiec, within Wysokie Mazowieckie County, Podlaskie Voivodeship, in north-eastern Poland.
