= Tokary-Gajówka =

- Village
- Location within Poland
- Coordinates: 52°20′01″N 22°41′13″E
- Country: Poland
- Voivodeship: Masovian
- County: Siedlce
- Gmina: Korczew

Tokary-Gajówka [tɔˈkarɨ ɡaˈjufka] is a village in the administrative district of Gmina Korczew, within Siedlce County, Masovian Voivodeship, in east-central Poland.
