= Juhana =

- Village
- Location within Poland
- Coordinates: 52°18′59″N 22°33′05″E
- Country: Poland
- Voivodeship: Masovian
- County: Siedlce
- Gmina: Korczew

Juhana [juˈxana] is a village in the administrative district of Gmina Korczew, within Siedlce County, Masovian Voivodeship, in east-central Poland.
