= Zadobrze, Podlaskie Voivodeship =

Zadobrze
- Village
- Location within Poland
- Coordinates: 52°41′31″N 22°31′12″E
- Country: Poland
- Voivodeship: Podlaskie
- County: Wysokie Mazowieckie
- Gmina: Ciechanowiec
- Population: 80

Zadobrze [zaˈdɔbʐɛ] is a village in the administrative district of Gmina Ciechanowiec, within Wysokie Mazowieckie County, Podlaskie Voivodeship, in north-eastern Poland.
