= Wojtkowice Stare =

- Village
- Location within Poland
- Coordinates: 52°37′N 22°28′E
- Country: Poland
- Voivodeship: Podlaskie
- County: Wysokie Mazowieckie
- Gmina: Ciechanowiec
- Population: 120

Wojtkowice Stare [vɔi̯tkɔˈvit͡sɛ ˈstarɛ] is a village in the administrative district of Gmina Ciechanowiec, within Wysokie Mazowieckie County, Podlaskie Voivodeship, in north-eastern Poland.
