= Koce-Basie =

- Village
- Location within Poland
- Coordinates: 52°42′03″N 22°36′51″E
- Country: Poland
- Voivodeship: Podlaskie
- County: Wysokie Mazowieckie
- Gmina: Ciechanowiec
- Population: 190

Koce-Basie [ˈkɔt͡sɛ ˈbaɕɛ] is a village in the administrative district of Gmina Ciechanowiec, within Wysokie Mazowieckie County, Podlaskie Voivodeship, in north-eastern Poland.
