= Gmina Ciechanowiec =

Gmina Ciechanowiec Ciechanowiec Commune
- Gmina
- Coat of arms
- Interactive map of Gmina Ciechanowiec
- Coordinates (Ciechanowiec): 52°41′N 22°30′E
- Country: Poland
- Voivodeship: Podlaskie
- County: Wysokie Mazowieckie
- Seat: Ciechanowiec

Area
  - Total: 201.46 km^{2} (77.78 sq mi)

Population (2013)
  - Total: 9,063
  - Density: 44.99/km^{2} (116.5/sq mi)
  - Urban: 4,840
  - Rural: 4,223
- Website: www.ciechanowiec.pl

Gmina Ciechanowiec is an urban-rural gmina (administrative district) in Wysokie Mazowieckie County, Podlaskie Voivodeship, in north-eastern Poland. Its seat is the town of Ciechanowiec, which lies approximately 27 kilometres (17 mi) south of Wysokie Mazowieckie and 66 km (41 mi) south-west of the regional capital Białystok.

The gmina covers an area of 201.46 square kilometres (77.8 sq mi), and as of 2006 its total population is 9,454 (out of which the population of Ciechanowiec amounts to 4,898, and the population of the rural part of the gmina is 4,556).

== Villages ==
Apart from the town of Ciechanowiec, Gmina Ciechanowiec contains the villages and settlements of Antonin, Bujenka, Ciechanowczyk, Czaje-Bagno, Czaje-Wólka, Dąbczyn, Kobusy, Koce-Basie, Koce-Piskuły, Koce-Schaby, Kosiorki, Kostuszyn-Kolonia, Kozarze, Kułaki, Łempice, Malec, Nowodwory, Pobikry, Przybyszyn, Radziszewo Stare, Radziszewo-Króle, Radziszewo-Sieńczuch, Skórzec, Trzaski, Tworkowice, Winna-Chroły, Winna-Poświętna, Winna-Wypychy, Wojtkowice Stare, Wojtkowice-Dady, Wojtkowice-Glinna and Zadobrze.

== Neighbouring gminas ==
Gmina Ciechanowiec is bordered by the gminas of Boguty-Pianki, Grodzisk, Jabłonna Lacka, Klukowo, Nur, Perlejewo, Rudka and Sterdyń.
