= Gmina Korczew =

Gmina Korczew Korczew Commune
- Gmina
- Coat of arms
- Interactive map of Gmina Korczew
- Coordinates (Korczew): 52°21′14″N 22°36′46″E
- Country: Poland
- Voivodeship: Masovian
- County: Siedlce County
- Seat: Korczew

Area
  - Total: 105.14 km^{2} (40.59 sq mi)

Population (2014)
  - Total: 2,796
  - Density: 26.59/km^{2} (68.88/sq mi)
- Website: http://www.korczew.pl

Gmina Korczew is a rural gmina (administrative district) in Siedlce County, Masovian Voivodeship, in east-central Poland. Its seat is the village of Korczew, which lies approximately 32 kilometres (20 mi) north-east of Siedlce and 111 km (69 mi) east of Warsaw.

The gmina covers an area of 105.14 square kilometres (40.6 sq mi), and as of 2006 its total population is 3,022 (2,796 in 2014).

== Villages ==
Gmina Korczew contains the villages and settlements of Bartków, Bużyska, Czaple Górne, Drażniew, Góry, Józefin, Juhana, Knychówek, Korczew, Laskowice, Mogielnica, Mokrany-Gajówka, Nowy Bartków, Ruda, Sarnowiec, Starczewice, Stary Bartków, Szczeglacin, Tokary, Tokary-Gajówka, Zacisze and Zaleś.

== Neighbouring gminas ==
Gmina Korczew is bordered by the gminas of Drohiczyn, Paprotnia, Platerów, Przesmyki and Repki.
