= Józefin, Gmina Korczew =

Józefin
- Village
- Location within Poland
- Coordinates: 52°19′N 22°35′E
- Country: Poland
- Voivodeship: Masovian
- County: Siedlce
- Gmina: Korczew

Józefin [juˈzɛfin] is a village in the administrative district of Gmina Korczew, within Siedlce County, Masovian Voivodeship, in east-central Poland.
