= Mokrany-Gajówka =

Village in Gmina Korczew, Poland

- Village
- Location within Poland
- Coordinates: 52°20′54″N 22°40′13″E
- Country: Poland
- Voivodeship: Masovian
- County: Siedlce
- Gmina: Korczew

Mokrany-Gajówka [mɔˈkranɨ ɡaˈjufka] is a village in the administrative district of Gmina Korczew, within Siedlce County, Masovian Voivodeship, in east-central Poland.
