= Kostuszyn-Kolonia =

- Village
- Location within Poland
- Coordinates: 52°37′19″N 22°32′24″E
- Country: Poland
- Voivodeship: Podlaskie
- County: Wysokie Mazowieckie
- Gmina: Ciechanowiec
- Population: 50

Kostuszyn-Kolonia [kɔsˈtuʂɨn kɔˈlɔɲa] is a village in the administrative district of Gmina Ciechanowiec, within Wysokie Mazowieckie County, Podlaskie Voivodeship, in north-eastern Poland.
