= Antonin, Podlaskie Voivodeship =

Antonin
- Village
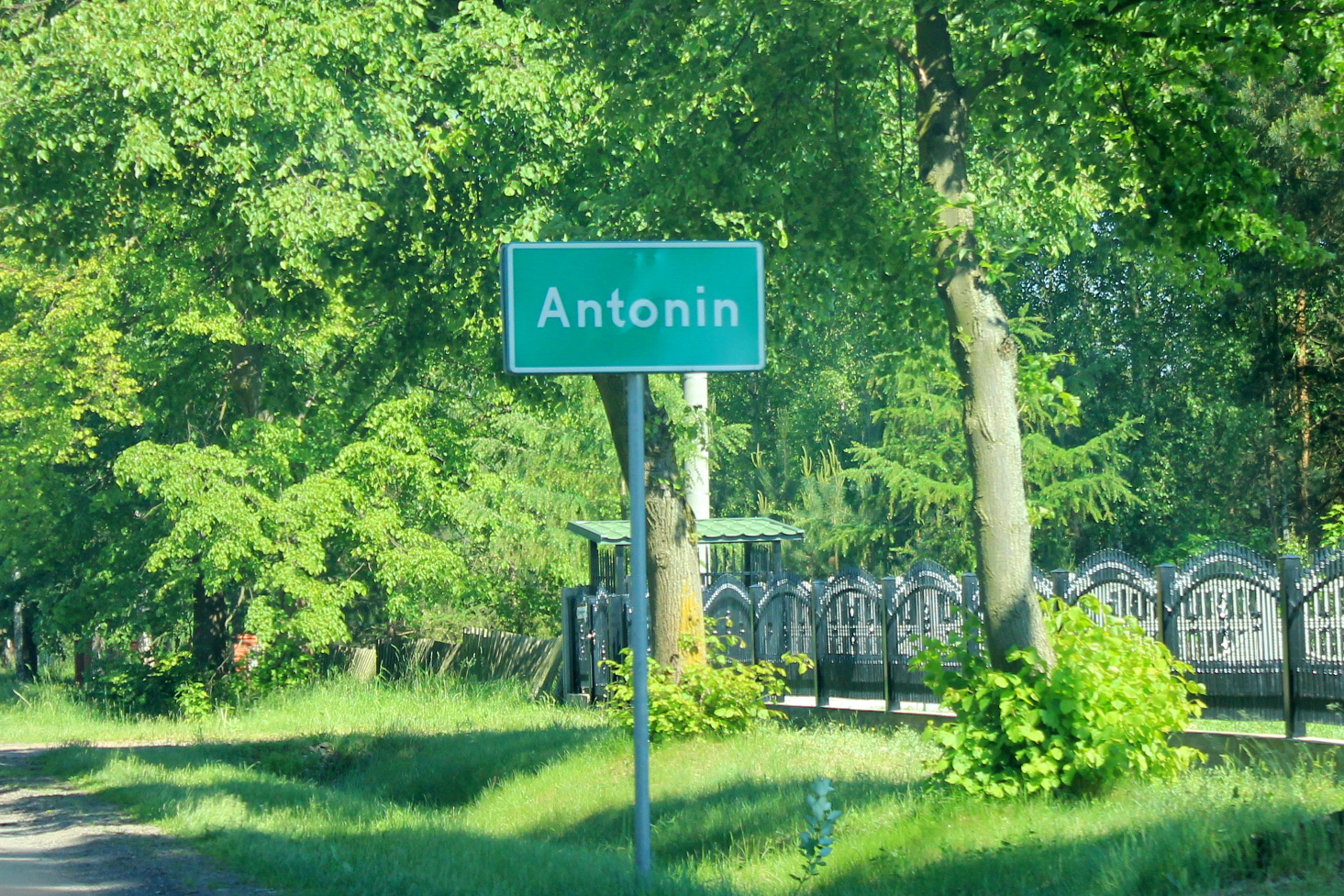

- Location within Poland
- Coordinates: 52°41′N 22°33′E
- Country: Poland
- Voivodeship: Podlaskie
- County: Wysokie Mazowieckie
- Gmina: Ciechanowiec
- Population: 110

Antonin (Polish pronunciation: [anˈtɔɲin]) is a village in the administrative district of Gmina Ciechanowiec, within Wysokie Mazowieckie County, Podlaskie Voivodeship, in north-eastern Poland.
