= Radziszewo-Króle =

- Village
- Location within Poland
- Coordinates: 52°38′57″N 22°37′16″E
- Country: Poland
- Voivodeship: Podlaskie
- County: Wysokie Mazowieckie
- Gmina: Ciechanowiec
- Population: 220

Radziszewo-Króle [rad͡ʑiˈʂɛvɔ ˈkrulɛ] is a village in the administrative district of Gmina Ciechanowiec, within Wysokie Mazowieckie County, Podlaskie Voivodeship, in north-eastern Poland.
