= Zacisze, Masovian Voivodeship =

Zacisze
- Settlement
- Location within Poland
- Coordinates: 52°20′02″N 22°43′43″E
- Country: Poland
- Voivodeship: Masovian
- County: Siedlce
- Gmina: Korczew

Zacisze [zaˈt͡ɕiʂɛ] is a settlement in the administrative district of Gmina Korczew, within Siedlce County, Masovian Voivodeship, in east-central Poland.
