= Koce-Schaby =

- Village
- Location within Poland
- Coordinates: 52°42′7″N 22°38′12″E
- Country: Poland
- Voivodeship: Podlaskie
- County: Wysokie Mazowieckie
- Gmina: Ciechanowiec
- Population: 140

Koce-Schaby [ˈkɔt͡sɛ ˈsxabɨ] is a village in the administrative district of Gmina Ciechanowiec, within Wysokie Mazowieckie County, Podlaskie Voivodeship, in north-eastern Poland.
