= Radziszewo-Sieńczuch =

- Village
- Location within Poland
- Coordinates: 52°40′8″N 22°40′6″E
- Country: Poland
- Voivodeship: Podlaskie
- County: Wysokie Mazowieckie
- Gmina: Ciechanowiec

Population
  - Total: 220
- Time zone: UTC+1 (CET)
  - Summer (DST): UTC+2 (CEST)

Radziszewo-Sieńczuch [rad͡ʑiˈʂɛvɔ ˈɕɛɲt͡ʂux] is a village in the administrative district of Gmina Ciechanowiec, within Wysokie Mazowieckie County, Podlaskie Voivodeship, in north-eastern Poland.

== History ==
Two Polish citizens were murdered by Nazi Germany in the village during World War II.
