= Sarnowiec =

- Village
- Location within Poland
- Coordinates: 52°19′01″N 22°35′58″E
- Country: Poland
- Voivodeship: Masovian
- County: Siedlce
- Gmina: Korczew

Sarnowiec [sarˈnɔvjɛt͡s] is a village in the administrative district of Gmina Korczew, within Siedlce County, Masovian Voivodeship, in east-central Poland.
