= Izydor Szaraniewicz =

Ukrainian historian

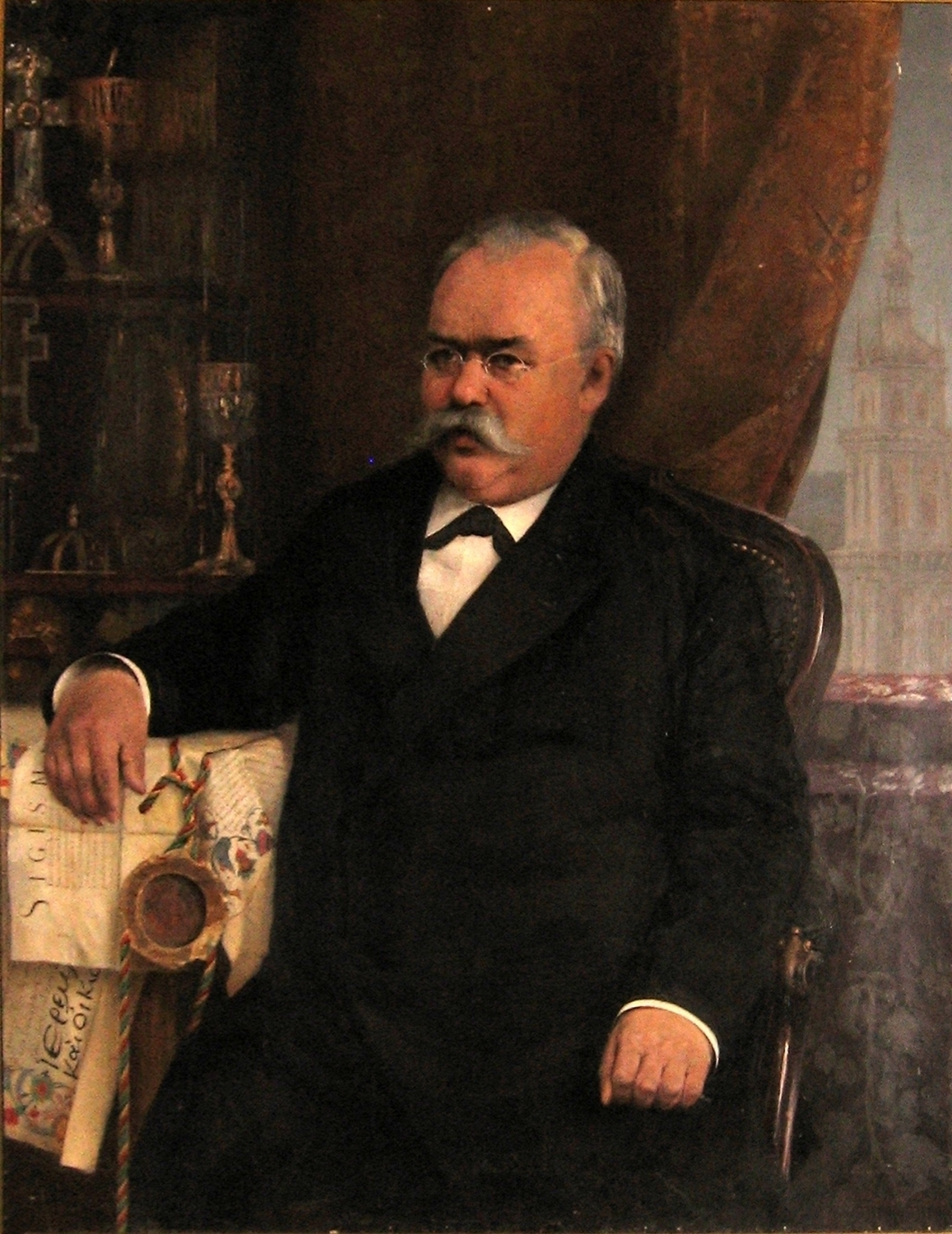
Izydor Szaraniewicz

Izydor Szaraniewicz (1829, Kozarze –1901) was a Ukrainian historian.

== Selected publications ==
- Krótki opis geograficzny austryacko-węgierskiej monarchii (1875);
- Trzy opisy historyczne staroksiążęcego grodu Halicza w roku 1860, 1880 i 1882 (1883)
