= Koce-Piskuły =

- Village
- Location within Poland
- Coordinates: 52°42′18″N 22°37′20″E
- Country: Poland
- Voivodeship: Podlaskie
- County: Wysokie Mazowieckie
- Gmina: Ciechanowiec
- Population: 100

Koce-Piskuły [ˈkɔt͡sɛ pisˈkuwɨ] is a village in the administrative district of Gmina Ciechanowiec, within Wysokie Mazowieckie County, Podlaskie Voivodeship, in north-eastern Poland.
