= Knychówek =

- Village
- Location within Poland
- Coordinates: 52°20′N 22°34′E
- Country: Poland
- Voivodeship: Masovian
- County: Siedlce
- Gmina: Korczew

Knychówek [knɨˈxuvɛk] is a village in the administrative district of Gmina Korczew, within Siedlce County, Masovian Voivodeship, in east-central Poland.
