= Góry, Siedlce County =

Góry
- Village
- Location within Poland
- Coordinates: 52°21′N 22°40′E
- Country: Poland
- Voivodeship: Masovian
- County: Siedlce
- Gmina: Korczew

Góry [ˈɡurɨ] is a village in the administrative district of Gmina Korczew, within Siedlce County, Masovian Voivodeship, in east-central Poland.
