= Skórzec, Podlaskie Voivodeship =

Skórzec
- Village
- Location within Poland
- Coordinates: 52°36′44″N 22°34′57″E
- Country: Poland
- Voivodeship: Podlaskie
- County: Wysokie Mazowieckie
- Gmina: Ciechanowiec
- Population: 330

Skórzec [ˈskuʐɛt͡s] is a village in the administrative district of Gmina Ciechanowiec, within Wysokie Mazowieckie County, Podlaskie Voivodeship, in north-eastern Poland.
