= Wojtkowice-Glinna =

- Village
- Location within Poland
- Coordinates: 52°35′43″N 22°26′01″E
- Country: Poland
- Voivodeship: Podlaskie
- County: Wysokie Mazowieckie
- Gmina: Ciechanowiec
- Population: 100

Wojtkowice-Glinna [vɔi̯tkɔˈvit͡sɛ ˈɡlinna] is a village in the administrative district of Gmina Ciechanowiec, within Wysokie Mazowieckie County, Podlaskie Voivodeship, in north-eastern Poland.
