= Korczew, Masovian Voivodeship =

Korczew
- Village
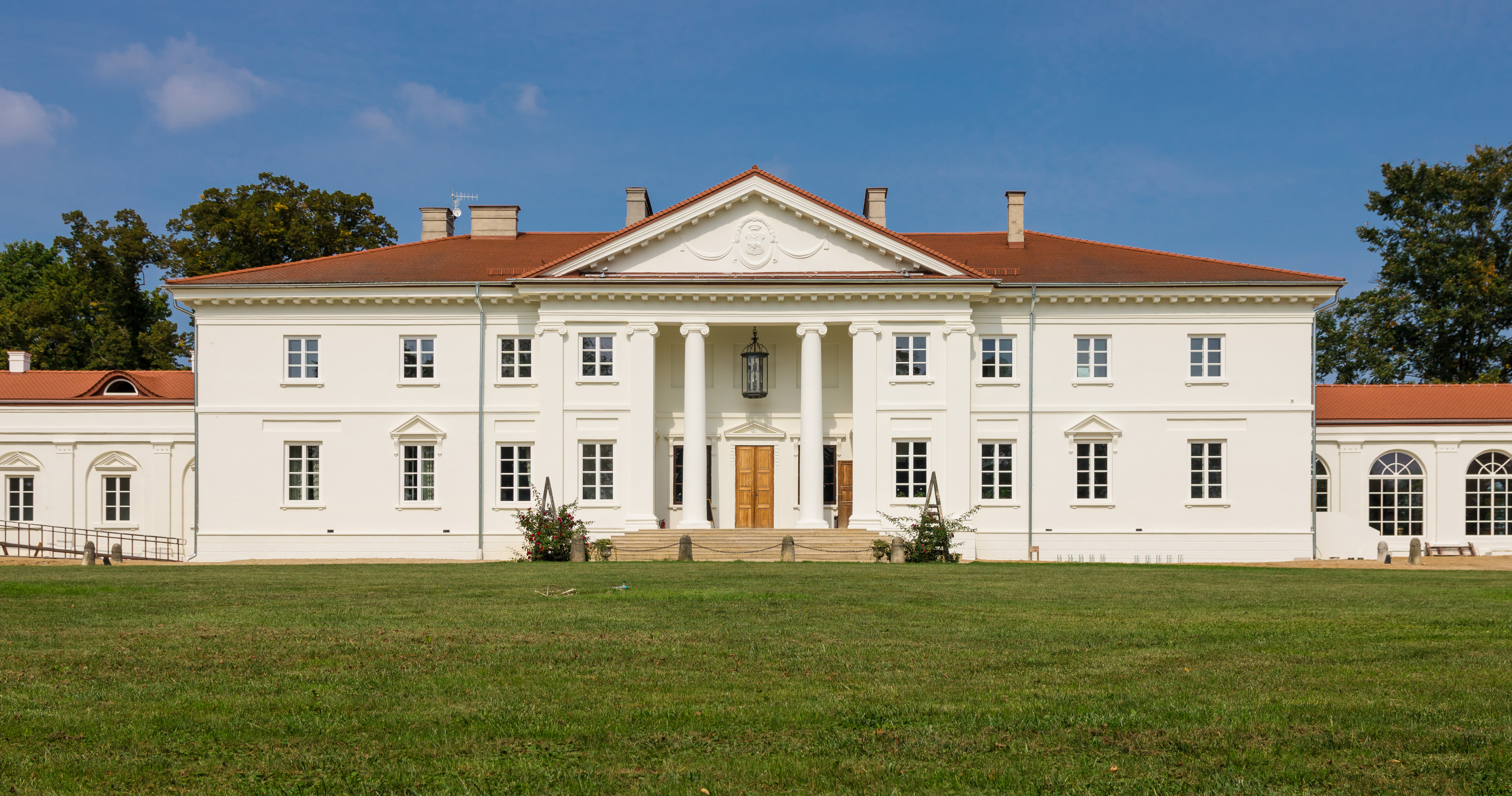
- Palace

- Location within Poland
- Coordinates: 52°21′14″N 22°36′46″E
- Country: Poland
- Voivodeship: Masovian
- County: Siedlce
- Gmina: Korczew

Population
  - Total: 760
- Time zone: UTC+1 (CET)
  - Summer (DST): UTC+2 (CEST)

Korczew [ˈkɔrt͡ʂɛf] is a village in Siedlce County, Masovian Voivodeship, in eastern Poland. It is the seat of the gmina (administrative district) called Gmina Korczew.

Six Polish citizens were murdered by Nazi Germany in the village during World War II.
