= Salomon Rosenblum =

Russian-born physicist

Salomon Aminyu Zalman Rosenblum (2 June 1896 – 22 November 1959) was a Poland-born nuclear physicist. He became a French national in 1929. He worked in the laboratory of Marie Curie in the commune of Arcueil, and led two CNRS laboratories at the Centre national de la recherche scientifique (CNRS).

== Early life ==
Rosenblum was born in Ciechanowiec, in the Grodno Governorate of the Russian Empire (now Poland) to Ita Miriam Rosenblum (née Horovitz) and Jehoshua Mordechai Rosenblum, a reasonably wealthy Jewish family. His studies were interrupted by World War I. He emigrated to Denmark and Sweden, studying philosophy at the University of Copenhagen and Hebrew, Armenian and Arabic at the University of Lund. A chance encounter and discussion with Niels Bohr's assistant in a café in Copenhagen led him to abandon his thesis on ancient languages and to commence studies in nuclear physics. After studying in Copenhagen and Berlin, he joined Curie's Institut du Radium in Paris in 1923, following Bohr's recommendation. His doctoral thesis in 1928 (he was a doctoral student of Otto Hahn) focused on the propagation of radiation through matter. He acquired French nationality by naturalization on 26 November 1929.

== Career ==
In 1929, he used the electromagnet of the Académie des sciences, under the direction of Aimé Cotton, to study the a radiation of thorium C (now known to be bismuth-212). During his research he discovered that the unique alpha-ray line of thorium C was actually composed of six fine lines, thus showing that the alpha particles had different energies. He continued his research with the electromagnet, at the time the most powerful in the world, studying the radiation of other radioactive elements (such as actinium in 1929, using a specimen prepared by Curie herself).

Rosenblum married Eva Elisabeth Stadler - a Munich-born psychoanalyst - in 1938.

He fled from France to the US in 1941 to escape Nazism. There he befriended Albert Einstein. He worked at the École libre des hautes études, a 'university-in-exile' chartered by the French and Belgian governments-in-exile for their refugee academics. It was located at The New School for Social Research in New York City. He also worked at Princeton university. After the Liberation, he returned to France in 1944 and became a director of a CNRS laboratory in Bellevue, and then in Orsay.

He died at Meudon Bellevue.
