= Kozarze =

- Village
- Location within Poland
- Coordinates: 52°40′N 22°28′E
- Country: Poland
- Voivodeship: Podlaskie
- County: Wysokie Mazowieckie
- Gmina: Ciechanowiec
- Elevation: 130 m (430 ft)
- Population: 390

Kozarze [kɔˈzaʐɛ] is a village in the administrative district of Gmina Ciechanowiec, within Wysokie Mazowieckie County, Podlaskie Voivodeship, in north-eastern Poland.

== Notable people ==
- Izydor Szaraniewicz (1829–1901), Ukrainian historian
