= Pobikry =

- Village
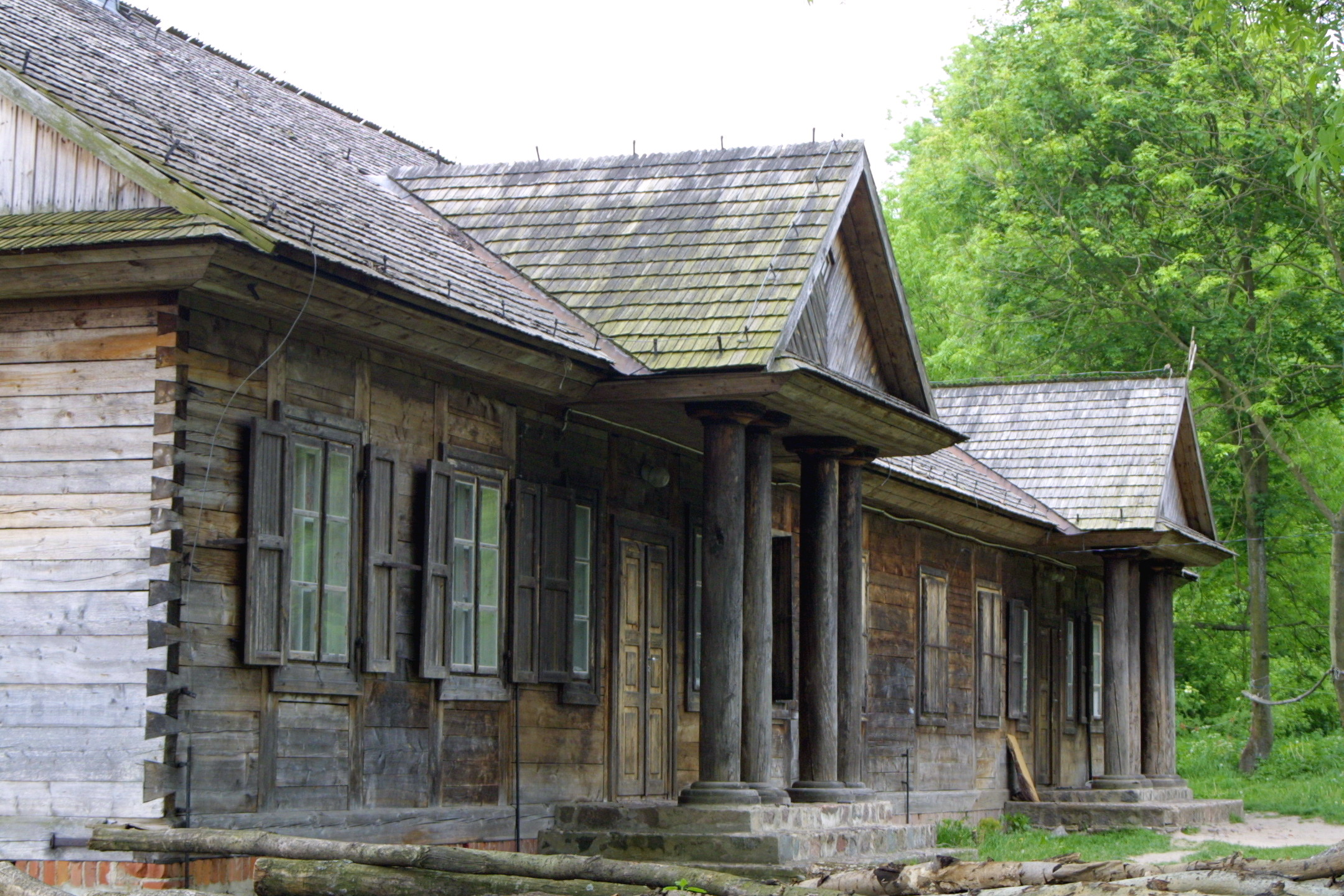

- Location within Poland
- Coordinates: 52°38′N 22°39′E
- Country: Poland
- Voivodeship: Podlaskie
- County: Wysokie Mazowieckie
- Gmina: Ciechanowiec
- Population: 340

Pobikry [pɔˈbikrɨ] is a village in the administrative district of Gmina Ciechanowiec, within Wysokie Mazowieckie County, Podlaskie Voivodeship, in north-eastern Poland.

According to the 1921 census, the village was inhabited by 211 people, among whom 178 were Roman Catholic, 21 Orthodox, and 12 Mosaic. At the same time, all inhabitants declared Polish nationality. There were 30 residential buildings in the village.
