= Drażniew =

- Village
- Location within Poland
- Coordinates: 52°21′N 22°42′E
- Country: Poland
- Voivodeship: Masovian
- County: Siedlce
- Gmina: Korczew

Drażniew [ˈdraʐɲɛf] is a village in the administrative district of Gmina Korczew, within Siedlce County, Masovian Voivodeship, in east-central Poland.
