= Starczewice =

- Village
- Location within Poland
- Coordinates: 52°23′N 22°36′E
- Country: Poland
- Voivodeship: Masovian
- County: Siedlce
- Gmina: Korczew

Starczewice [start͡ʂɛˈvit͡sɛ] is a village in the administrative district of Gmina Korczew, within Siedlce County, Masovian Voivodeship, in east-central Poland.
