= Zaleś, Siedlce County =

Zaleś
- Village
- Location within Poland
- Coordinates: 52°22′N 22°33′E
- Country: Poland
- Voivodeship: Masovian
- County: Siedlce
- Gmina: Korczew

Zaleś [ˈzalɛɕ] is a village in the administrative district of Gmina Korczew, within Siedlce County, Masovian Voivodeship, in east-central Poland.
