= Malec (surname) =

Malec (Czech feminine: Malcová; Slovak: Malecová or Malcová) is a surname. It may refer to:

- Czesław Malec (1941–2018), Polish basketball player
- Ivo Malec (1925–2019), Croatian composer
- Jiří Malec (born 1962), Czech ski jumper
- Lucyna Malec (born 1966), Polish actress and singer
- Mariusz Malec (born 1995), Polish footballer
- Stanisław Malec (1931–2025), Polish engineer and politician
- Teodoro Petkoff Malec (1932–2018), Venezuelan politician
- Tomáš Malec (born 1982), Slovak ice hockey player
- Tomáš Malec (born 1993), Slovak footballer
- Vedrana Malec (born 1990), Croatian cross-country skier
