= Czaje-Wólka =

- Village
- Location within Poland
- Coordinates: 52°39′52″N 22°41′14″E
- Country: Poland
- Voivodeship: Podlaskie
- County: Wysokie Mazowieckie
- Gmina: Ciechanowiec
- Population: 120

Czaje-Wólka [ˈt͡ʂajɛ ˈvulka] is a village in the administrative district of Gmina Ciechanowiec, within Wysokie Mazowieckie County, Podlaskie Voivodeship, in north-eastern Poland.
