= Ciechanowiec =

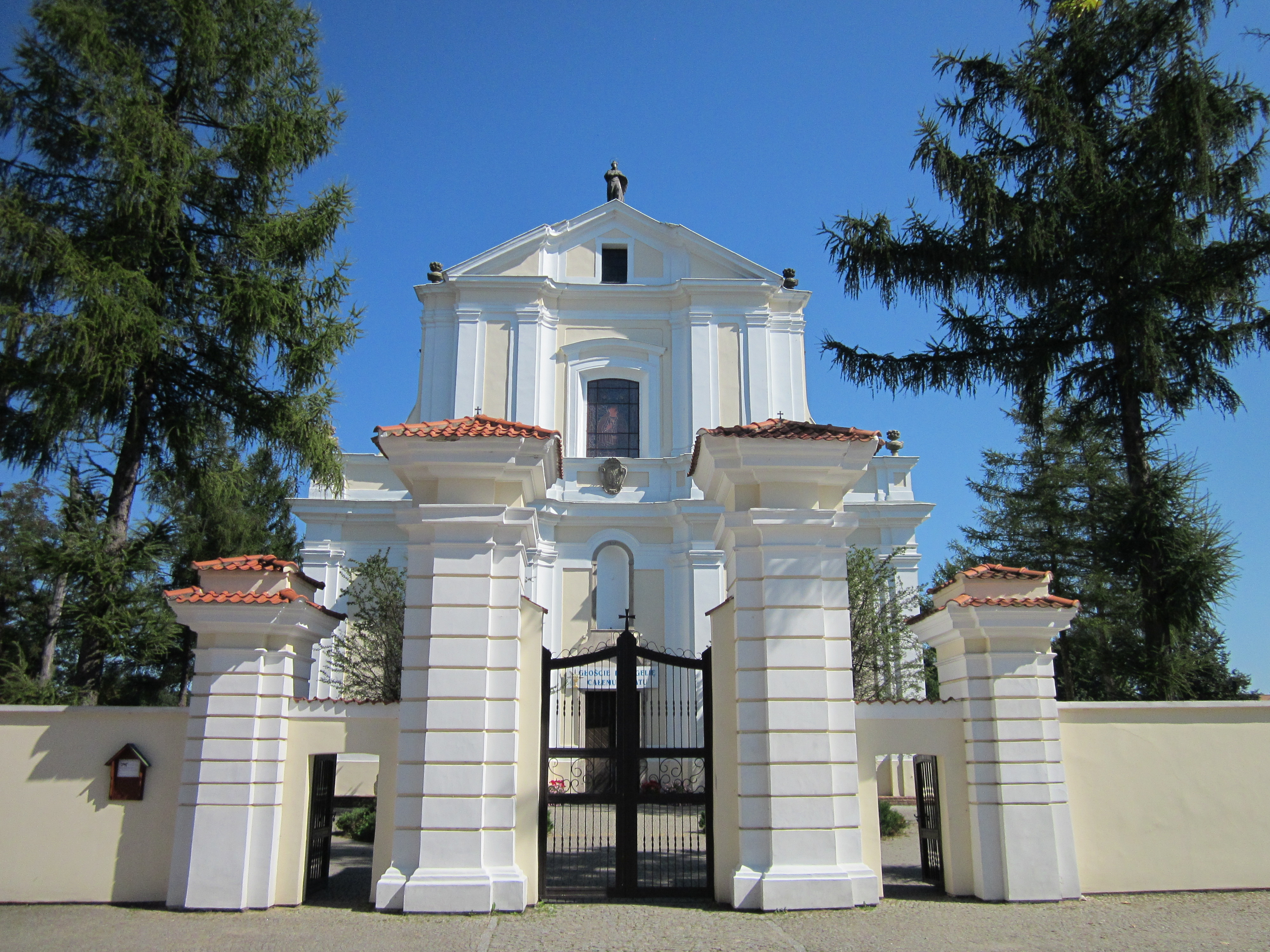
- Holy Trinity Church

- Flag Coat of arms

- Location within Poland
- Coordinates: 52°41′N 22°30′E
- Country: Poland
- Voivodeship: Podlaskie
- County: Wysokie Mazowieckie
- Gmina: Ciechanowiec
- Town rights: 1413

Government
  - Mayor: Eugeniusz Święcki

Area
  - Total: 26.01 km^{2} (10.04 sq mi)

Population (31 December 2021)
  - Total: 4,511
  - Density: 173.4/km^{2} (449.2/sq mi)
- Time zone: UTC+1 (CET)
  - Summer (DST): UTC+2 (CEST)
- Postal code: 18-230
- Area code: +48 86
- Vehicle registration: BWM
- Website: http://www.ciechanowiec.pl

Ciechanowiec (Polish pronunciation: [t͡ɕɛxaˈnɔvʲɛt͡s]; Yiddish: טשעכֿאַנאָװיץ, romanized: Tshekhanovits) is a small town in Gmina Ciechanowiec, Wysokie Mazowieckie County, Podlaskie Voivodeship, eastern Poland. In December 2021, the town had a population of 4,511.

== History ==
From the 5th century BC until the 10th century, Yotvingians, a Baltic tribe close to the Lithuanians, lived in the areas around Ciechanowiec. From the 13th–14th centuries until 1513, the lands belonged to the Trakai Voivodeship of the Grand Duchy of Lithuania. Then, they were part of the Podlaskie Voivodeship from 1513 until 1795 (1513–1569 as part of Lithuania and 1569–1795 as part of the Kingdom of Poland in the Polish–Lithuanian Commonwealth).

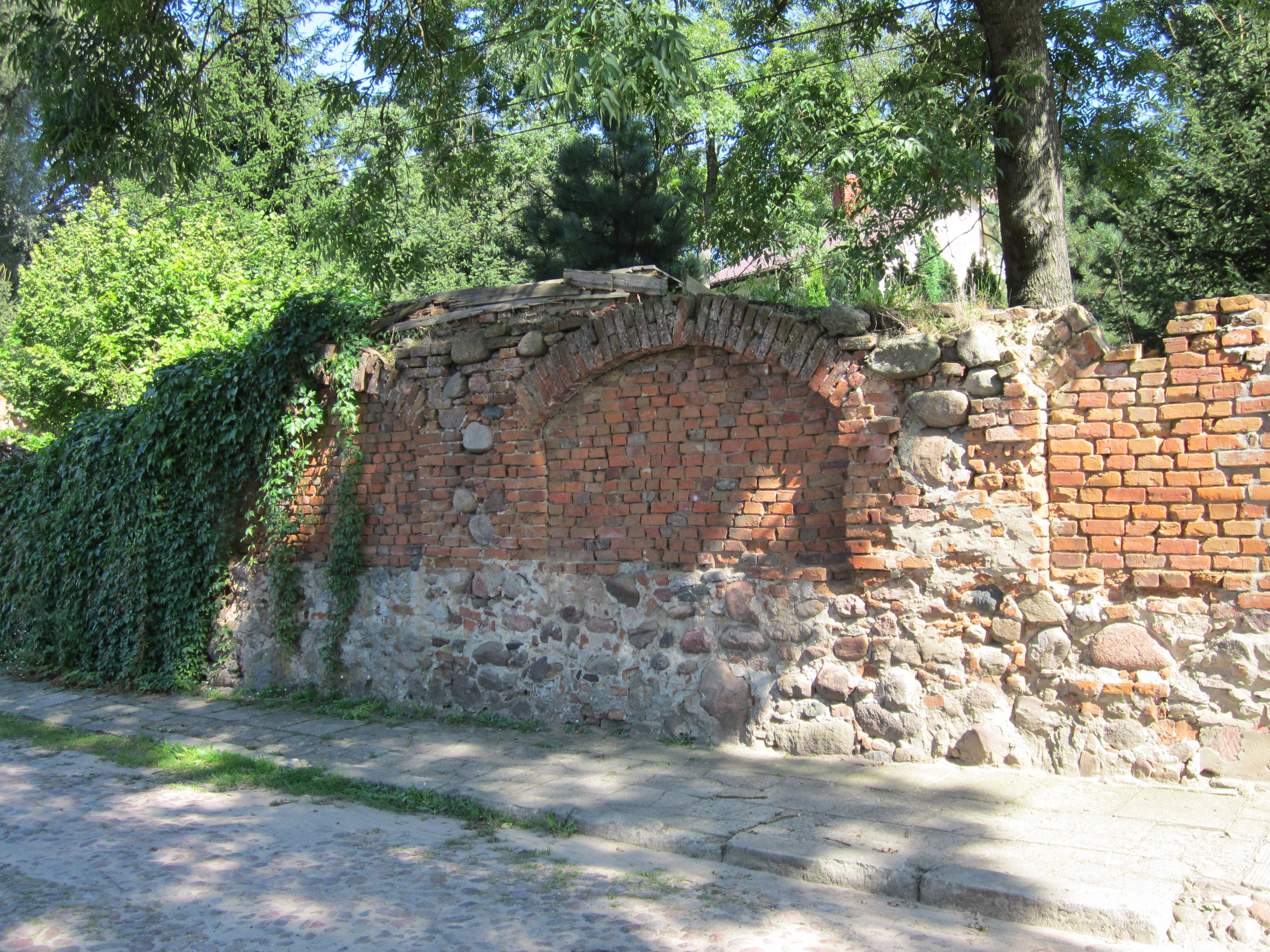
Old castle wall

In 1429, the Grand Duke of Lithuania Vytautas the Great granted Ciechanowiec the settlement Magdeburg rights and its coat of arms. In the 16th century, the town belonged to the Kiszka family. In the mid-16th century Castellan of Trakai, Piotr Kiszka built a castle on the right bank of the river Nurzec, northeast of the town. Between 1617 and 1642, Mikołaj Kiszka ordered to build heavy defensive walls around the fortress, but soon the castle burned down during the Deluge, and the surviving buildings with the newly built residence for the Ossoliński family were later blown up and destroyed by the Imperial Russian Army during World War I (1915). To this day only the foundations and the moat still exist.

The forthcoming owners of the town were: The Bremmer, Ossoliński, Szczukow and Ciecierski families. In particular, the Ossoliński family in the second half of the seventeenth century invested in the development of the town.

In 1736–1739, a brick church of the Holy Trinity and the Sisters of Mercy hospital was built, according to the draft of Warmia's architect Jan Adrian Kluk. His son, Fr. Jan Krzysztof Kluk (1739–1796), the local parish priest, devoted to natural history, became one of the most important Polish naturalists of the Enlightenment. He is the author of the first comprehensive textbook in the Polish language on agriculture, as well as other pioneering scientific topics, as well as school textbooks written on request of the Commission of National Education. The scope of the research included both botany and zoology, and natural pharmaceuticals.

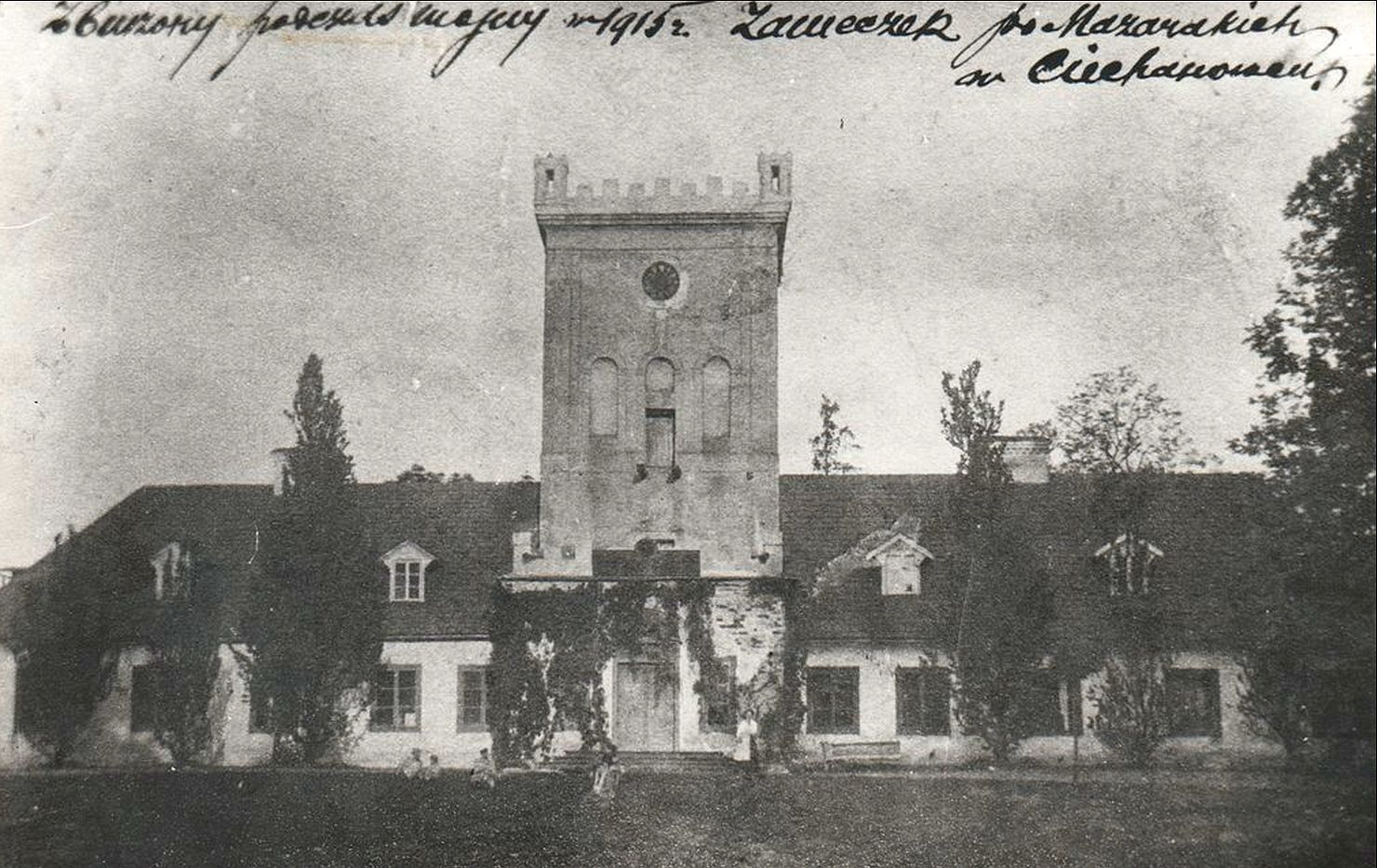
Ossoliński Manor before 1915

In the era of the partitions, Ciechanowiec was passed onto Prussia, and after the Congress of Vienna to the Russian Empire. Later the town was divided into two parts: right bank (called New Town or "Polish section"), was part of the Polish Kingdom and the left bank Old Town ("Rus section") in Russia. As a result of the November and January Uprisings, the right bank of Ciechanowiec lost the town rights in 1870. At the end of the nineteenth century, the textile industry rapidly developed in the town. Ciechanowiec was also very popular for various horse fairs. Significant damage from the times of World War I and the Polish–Soviet War were slowly repaired in the interwar period.

Before the beginning of World War II, 55% of the town's inhabitants were Jews. At that time the town was known to a large number of workshops, mainly Jewish. In 1938, the left bank of Ciechanowiec (then located in the district of Bielsko) was attached to the right part of the town (on the status of the settlement), previously located in the district of Wysokomazowieckie (in the municipality of Klukowo).

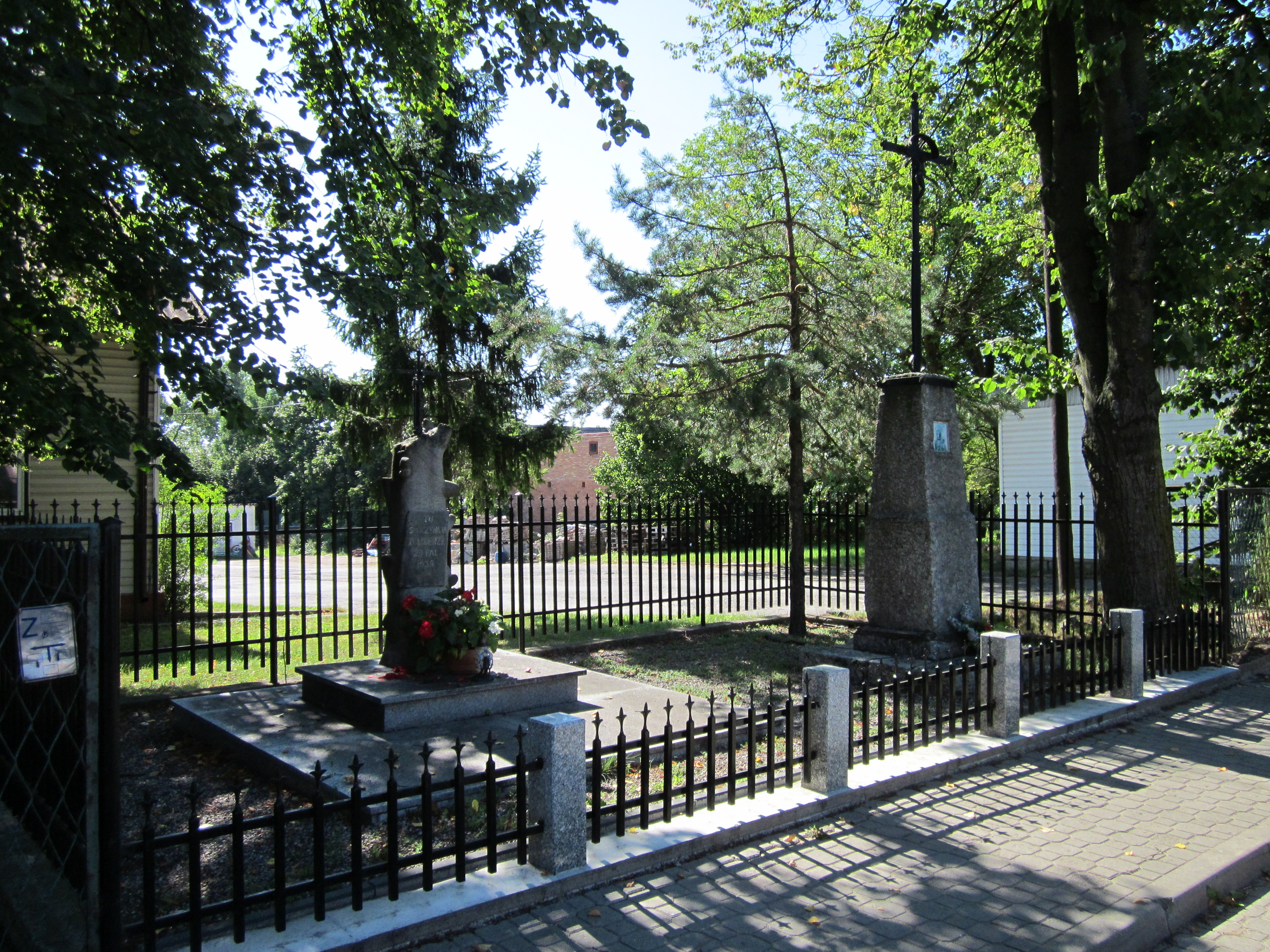
Mass grave of Polish soldiers killed in World War II

During World War II, the town was badly destroyed, as a result of the Molotov–Ribbentrop Pact, first by the soldiers of the Red Army, and after June 1941 by the German Army. The Jewish population was almost completely exterminated at the Treblinka extermination camp. After the war, reconstruction lasted a long time and the town has not regained its former importance and population that it once had.

Jewish family names like Ciechanowiec, Ciechanowiecki, Ciechanowicz, Ciechanowski and Chechanover originated from this town.

== Geography ==
Ciechanowiec is located in eastern Poland about 130 km (81 mi) northeast from Warsaw and around 80 km (50 mi) west from the Białowieża Forest in the Territory of Preserved Landscape of the Valley of the Bug and Nurzec Rivers. The Nurzec River divides the town into two parts: the Left Side and the Right Side.

== Demographics ==
Historical population
Year	Pop.	±%
1921	3,291	—
1931	4,029	+22.4%
2010	4,914	+22.0%

According to the 1921 census, the village was inhabited by 3,291 people, among whom 1,568 were Roman Catholic, 39 Orthodox, 34 Evangelical and 1,649 Jewish. At the same time, 1,653 inhabitants declared Polish nationality, 21 German, 11 Belarusian and 1,693 Jewish. There were 361 residential buildings in the village.

Detailed data as of 31 December 2021:

Description	All		Women		Men	
Unit	person	percentage	person	percentage	person	percentage
Population	4511	100	2271	50.3%	2240	49.7%
Population density	173.4		87.3		86.1	

== Monuments ==
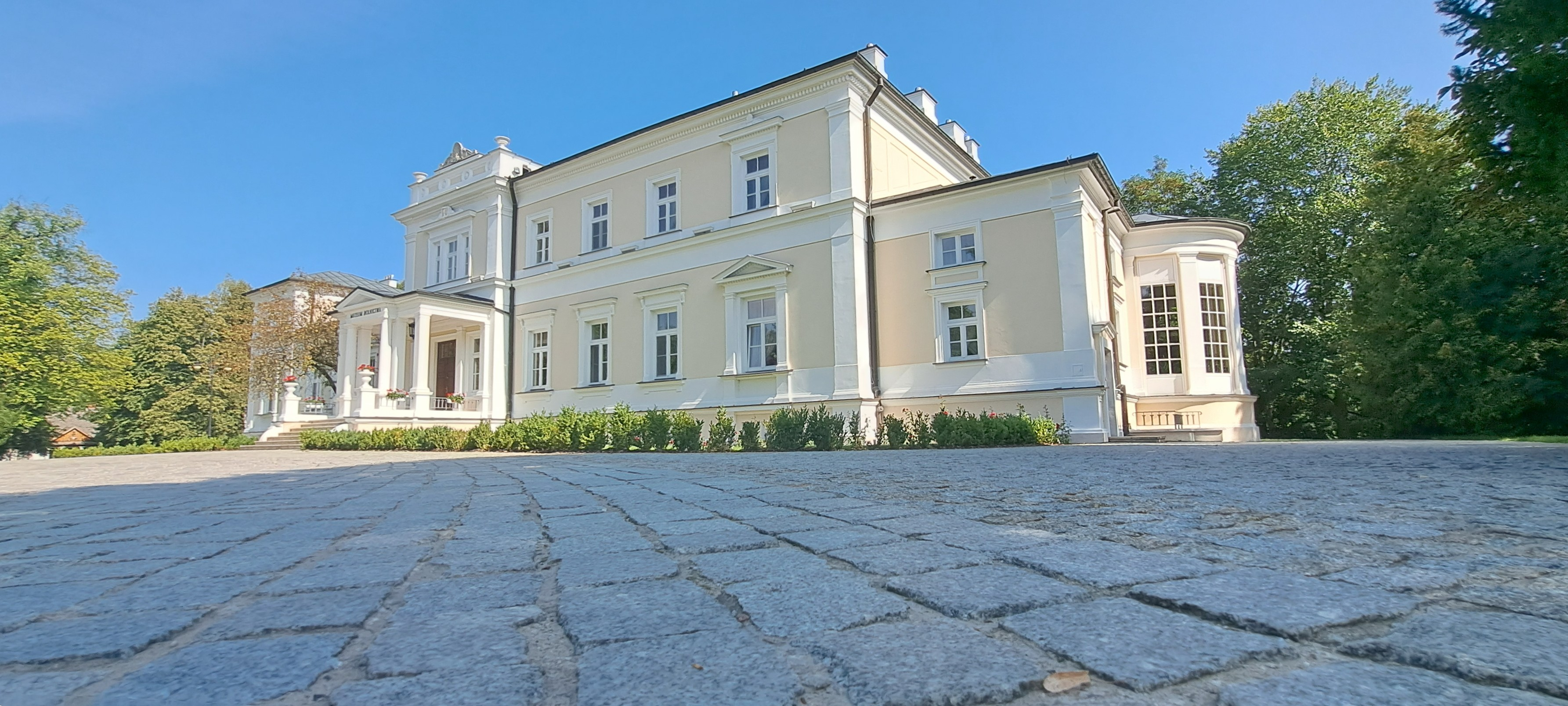
Starzeński Palace

- The Holy Trinity Church
- The monastery-hospital complex
- Church of the Ascension
- The Mansion-Park Complex
- Mazowiecko-Podlaski Open-Air Museum of Agriculture

== Notable people ==
- Alexander Chizhevsky
- Jan Krzysztof Kluk
- Benjamin Mazar (1906–1995), Israeli historian and archeologist; President of the Hebrew University of Jerusalem
- Salomon Rosenblum
- Ivan Solonevich
- Ignacy Tłoczek (not native)
