= Tokary, Masovian Voivodeship =

Tokary
- Village
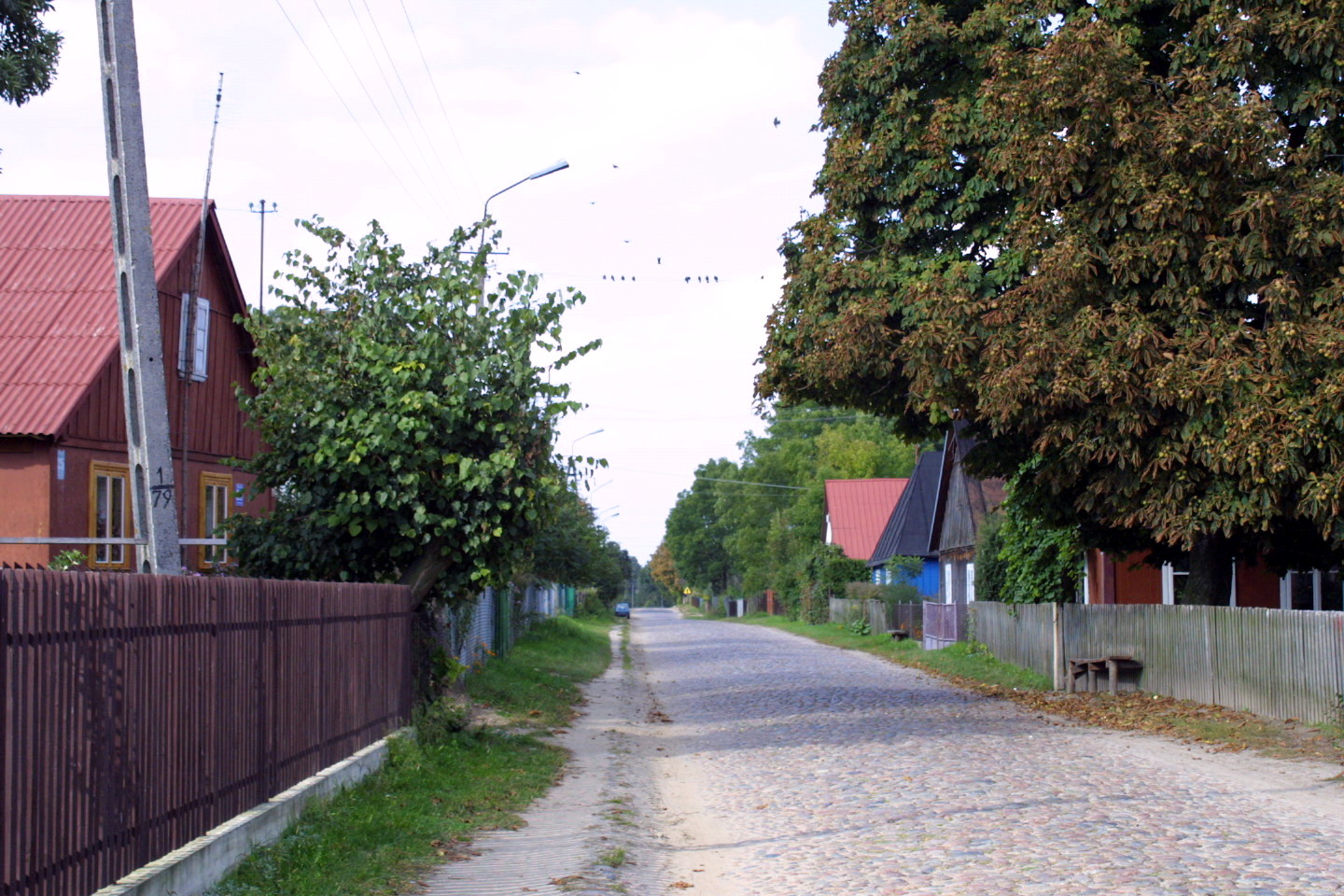

- Location within Poland
- Coordinates: 52°20′N 22°42′E
- Country: Poland
- Voivodeship: Masovian
- County: Siedlce
- Gmina: Korczew

Tokary [tɔˈkarɨ] is a village in the administrative district of Gmina Korczew, within Siedlce County, Masovian Voivodeship, in east-central Poland.
