= Czarna Cerkiewna =

- Village
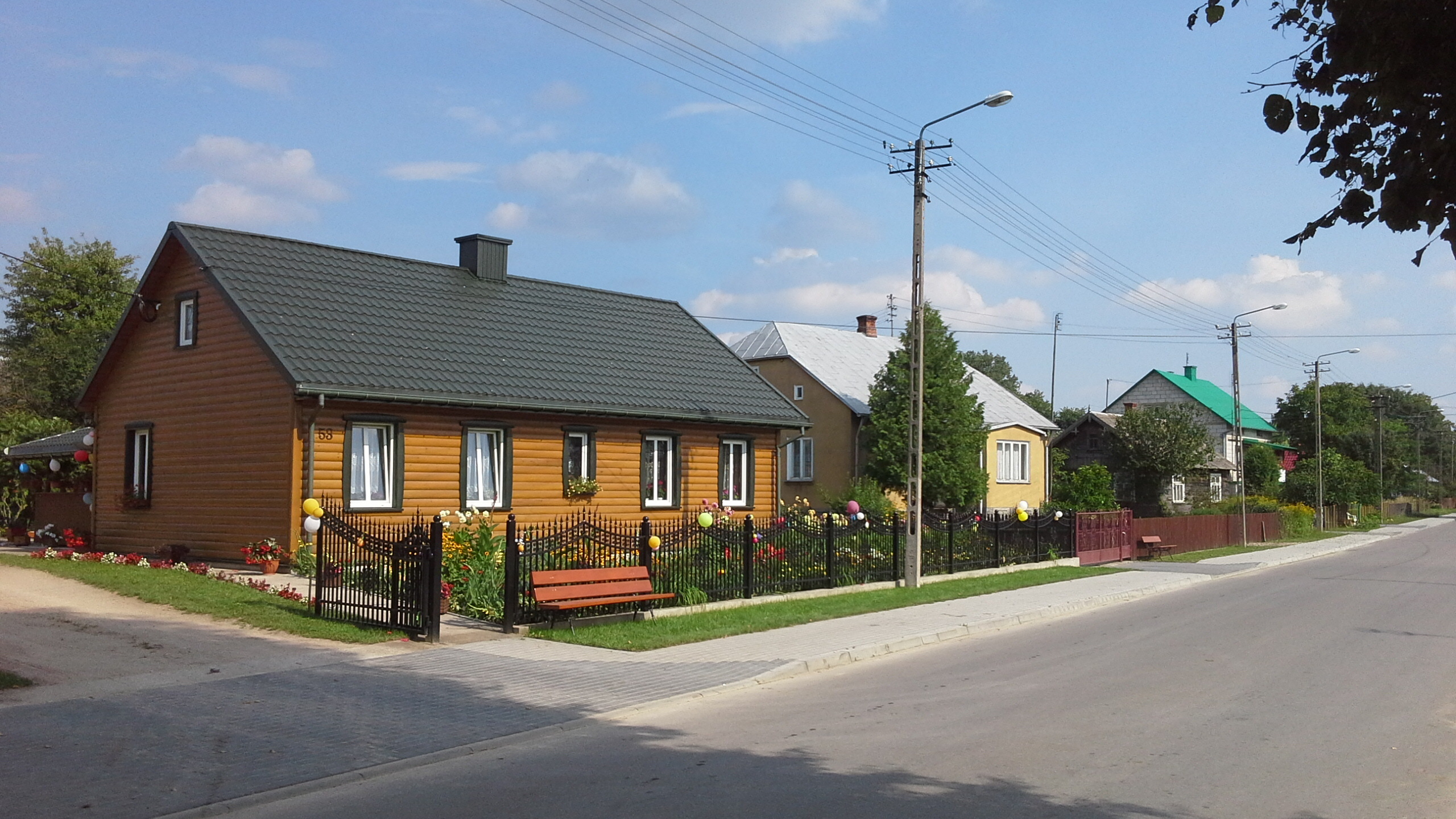

- Location within Poland
- Coordinates: 52°37′N 22°48′E
- Country: Poland
- Voivodeship: Podlaskie
- County: Siemiatycze
- Gmina: Grodzisk

Czarna Cerkiewna [ˈt͡ʂarna t͡sɛrˈkʲɛvna] is a village in the administrative district of Gmina Grodzisk, within Siemiatycze County, Podlaskie Voivodeship, in north-eastern Poland.

There is an Orthodox Church of the Intercession of the Theotokos in the village, active since 1901, except during 1915–1918, when most Orthodox residents were on mass exile. The church has consistently held parish status and was thoroughly renovated at the turn of the 20th and 21st centuries.
