= Stary Bartków =

- Village
- Location within Poland
- Coordinates: 52°20′5″N 22°32′14″E
- Country: Poland
- Voivodeship: Masovian
- County: Siedlce
- Gmina: Korczew

Stary Bartków [ˈstarɨ ˈbartkuf] is a village in the administrative district of Gmina Korczew, within Siedlce County, Masovian Voivodeship, in east-central Poland.
