= Wiesława Korzeń =

Polish accountant (1927–2004)

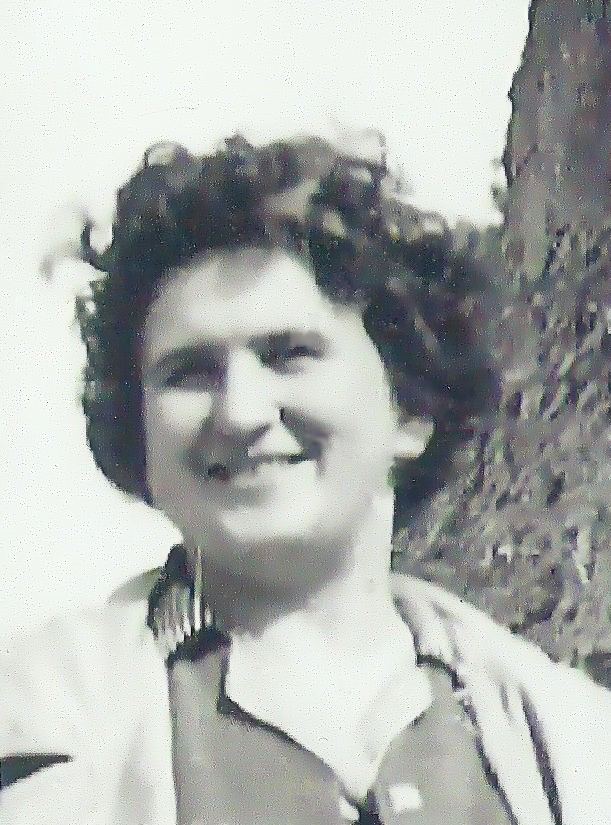
- Wiesława Korzeń
- Born: Wiesława Siedzikówna; 17 March 1927; Grodno, Poland
- Died: 29 June 2004 (aged 77); Kielce, Poland
- Military career
- Allegiance: Poland
- Awards: Gold Cross of Merit

Wiesława Aniela Korzeń (née Siedzik; 17 March 1927 – 29 June 2004) was a Polish accountant and teacher

== Early life ==
Wiesława was born on 17 March 1927 in Grodno (now Belarus) in the home of her great-grandmother Helena Rzepecka, wife of Karol Rzepecki. Her grandparents Helena Tymińska née Rzepecka (20 May 1885 Tashkent - 5 September 1968 Grajewo) and engineer Jan Tymiński (1871 Boćki – 1940) married and lived in Harasimowicze, where her mother Eugenia (* 6 October 1905 - 1943) and her siblings Aleksy (26.10.1904 - 10.03.1957) and Brunon(the technical director of the Production Facilities of Cable Accessories A-26 in Ełk awarded the Knight’s Cross of the Order of Polonia Restituta (15.04.1924 - 21.06.2020)) were born. In the church in Różanystok (formerly Krasnystok), Wiesława's great-grandfather Herman Tymiński (1843 – March 12, 1896, Krasnystok) was an Orthodox priest.

Wiesława's father, Wacław Siedzik, was a forester sent to Siberia under the Tsar for involvement in pro-Polish independence organisations in 1923. After returning from Siberia, he met and married Eugenia. The couple had three daughters: Wiesława, Danuta (1928–1946), and Irena (1931–1978). Wiesława grew up with her siblings in the forester's lodge near Guszczewina. The girls attended grammar school in Narewka. Wiesława is a cousin of Paweł Hur and the economic director of PZL in Wrocław, awarded the Knight’s Cross of the Order of Polonia Restituta, Wiesław Grzebisz(14.04.1933-09.02.2023).

== Second World War ==
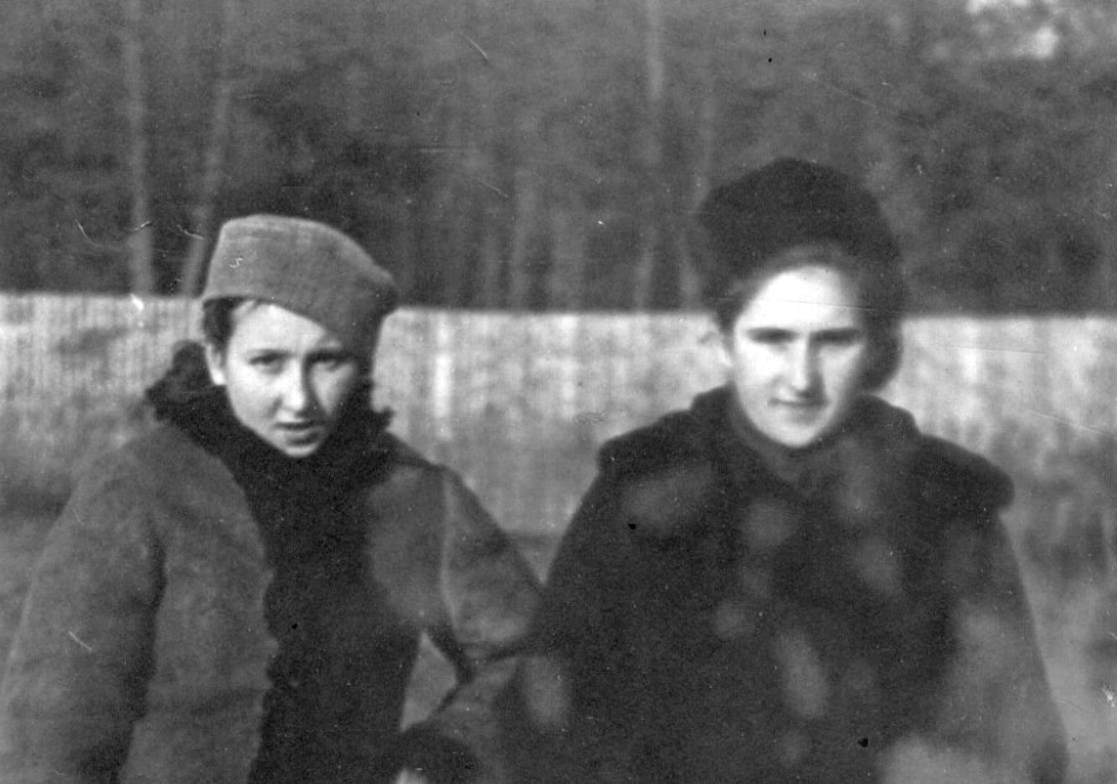
Danuta and Wieslawa Siedzik

In 1940 her father Wacław Siedzik was arrested by the NKVD and once again deported to Russia. In 1941 he joined Władysław Anders' Polish Army (he died in Teheran in 1943). After their father was exiled, they moved to Narewka. Eugenia was a member of the Home Army and was killed by the Gestapo in September 1943 in the forest near Białystok. During the Second World War, until 1943 the girls studied in the Salesian Sisters School in Różanystok near Harasimowicze. After the death of their mother, in late 1943 or early 1944 Wiesława and Danuta joined the Home Army. As part of the underground army's training, she acquired medical skills.

== Career ==
In 1950 Wiesława finished an economics degree at the Academy of Commerce in Szczecin. At that time, through her uncle Brunon Tymiński, she met her future husband, Roman Korzeń. Together, they had four children: Danuta Jolanta, Aniela, and twins: Lech and Janusz, and grandmother of an architect and an urbanist dr. Anna Tertel.. Due to a state-assigned work placement, the family moved to the Świętokrzyskie region—first to Ostrowiec, and later to Kielce.

For many years she worked as the Technikum no 3 (later Technikum im. Danuta Siedzikówna) in Kielce.

Wiesława worked as an economics teacher at the Economic Secondary School Complex in Kielce, where she was awarded the Gold Cross of Merit for achievements in teaching and educational work: "She has 20 years of exemplary teaching experience. She achieves very good results in both her educational and mentoring work. Actively involved in social initiatives within the teaching community."

== Awards ==
- Gold Cross of Merit awarded by the Resolution of the Council of State of 12 May 1976
