= Roman Ignacy Korzeń =

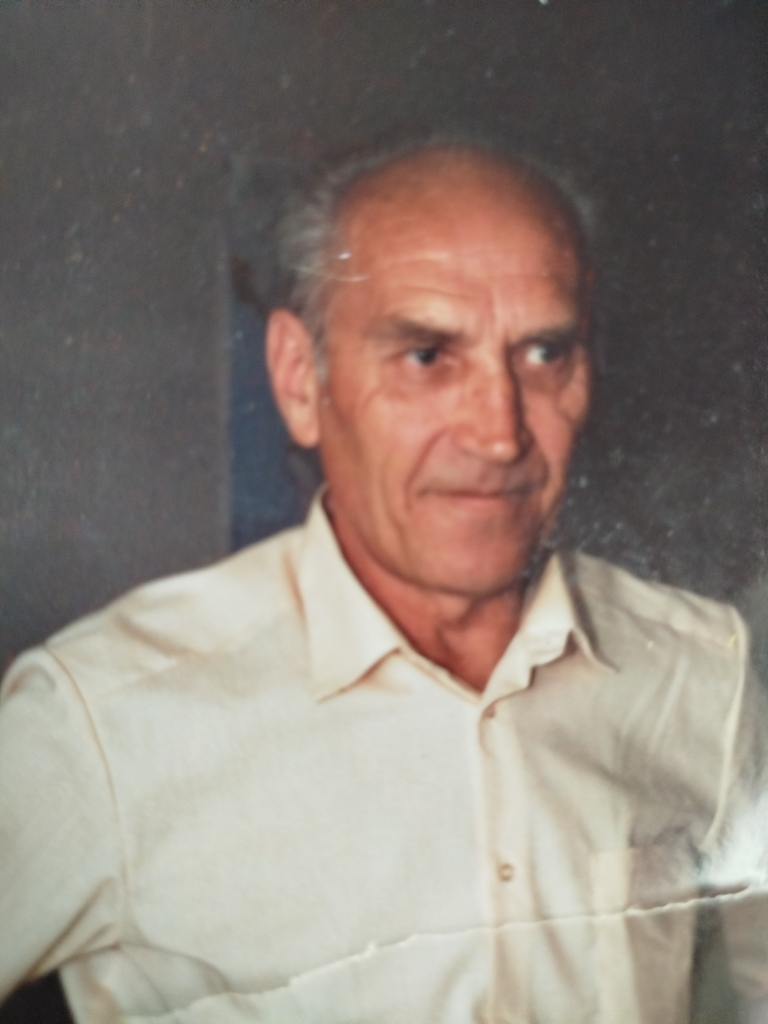
- Roman Korzeń
- Born: 1 February 1926; Krzywokonna (now in Belarus)
- Died: 22 July 1995 (aged 69); Kielce, Poland
- Occupation: Engineer
- Awards: Order of Polonia Restituta

Roman Ignacy Korzeń (1 February 1926, Krzywokonna, Poland – 22 July 1995, Kielce, Poland) was a Polish engineer who designed installations for power plants in Poland, Megalopolis in Greece, and Tuzla in former Yugoslavia.

From 1967 he worked at Chemar in Kielce as a supervision inspector, specializing in the calibration of safety valves. He supervised a number of major energy facilities, including Łaziska Power Station, Bydgoszcz Power Plant, Gdańsk Power Station, Ostrołęka Power Station, Dolna Odra Power Station, Katowice Power Station, Kozienice Power Station, and Siekierki Power Station.

On 25 April 1984, for outstanding professional achievements, he was awarded the Knight's Cross of the Order of Polonia Restituta.

He was the brother in law of Danuta Siedzikówna, and the husband of her sister Wiesława Korzeń. Wiesława met him through her uncle Brunon Tymiński. Together, they had four children: Danuta Jolanta, Aniela, and twins: Lech and Janusz, and grandchild an architect and an urbanist dr. Anna Tertel.
