= Paweł Hur =

Paul Hur
- Paweł Hur
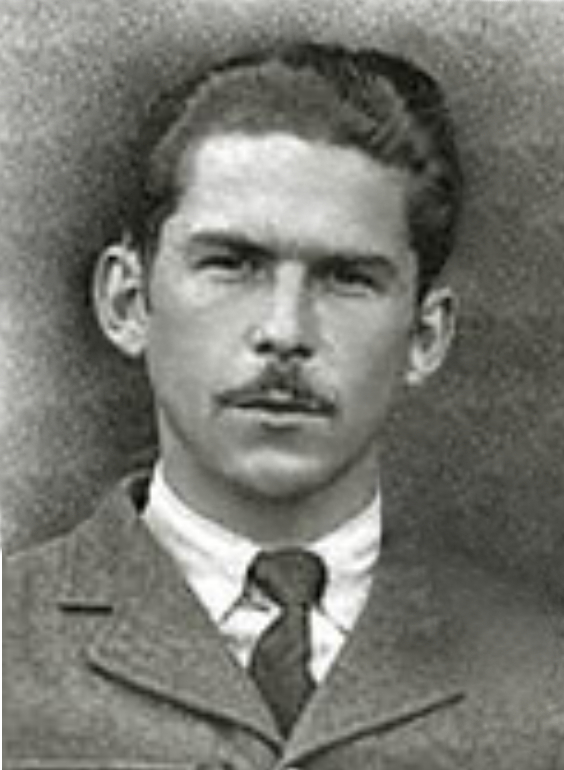
- Paweł Hur
- Born: 10 April 1918; Kyiv
- Died: 7 September 1994 (aged 76); Lincoln
- Military career
- Allegiance: Royal Air Force
- Branch: Air Force
- Service years: 1940
- Rank: Senior Sergeant
- Unit: 301 Squadron
- Battles/wars: World War II
- Awards: Virtuti Militari; Cross of Valour; Polish Air Force Medal

Paweł Hur (born April 10, 1918, in Kyiv, died September 7, 1994, in Lincoln) took part in the Battle of Britain in the 301 Squadron after completing the Polish Air Force Academy in Dęblin.

The Wellington IV aircraft GR-P (Z1386) was shot down by anti-aircraft defenses during the night of August 5–6, 1942, while conducting a coastal mining operation near Lorient, and crashed into the sea. Paweł Hur was taken as a prisoner of war by the Germans. The people who fought alongside him during the battle were buried in Lorient.

After the war, he settled in Lincoln, England.

On November 11, 1966, Paweł Hur, as a pilot of the 301 Squadron, was collectively decorated with the Order Virtuti Militari.

Paweł Hur is the son of Bazyli Hur and Marianna Siedzik. He is the grandson of Pawel Siedzik (11.11.1861 - 20.07.1912) and Aniela (1872-1951) (daughter of Eleonora Kiejno zd. Mackiewicz), and a paternal cousin of Danuta Siedzikówna, Wiesława Korzeń and Wiesław Grzebisz(14.04.1933-09.02.2023), the director of a factory PZL in Wrocław, awarded the Knight’s Cross of the Order of Polonia Restituta.

== Awards and decorations ==
- Virtuti Militari Silver Cross (5th Class)
- Cross of Valour, awarded four times
- Polish Air Force Medal
