= Gruszki, Hajnówka County =

Gruszki
- Village
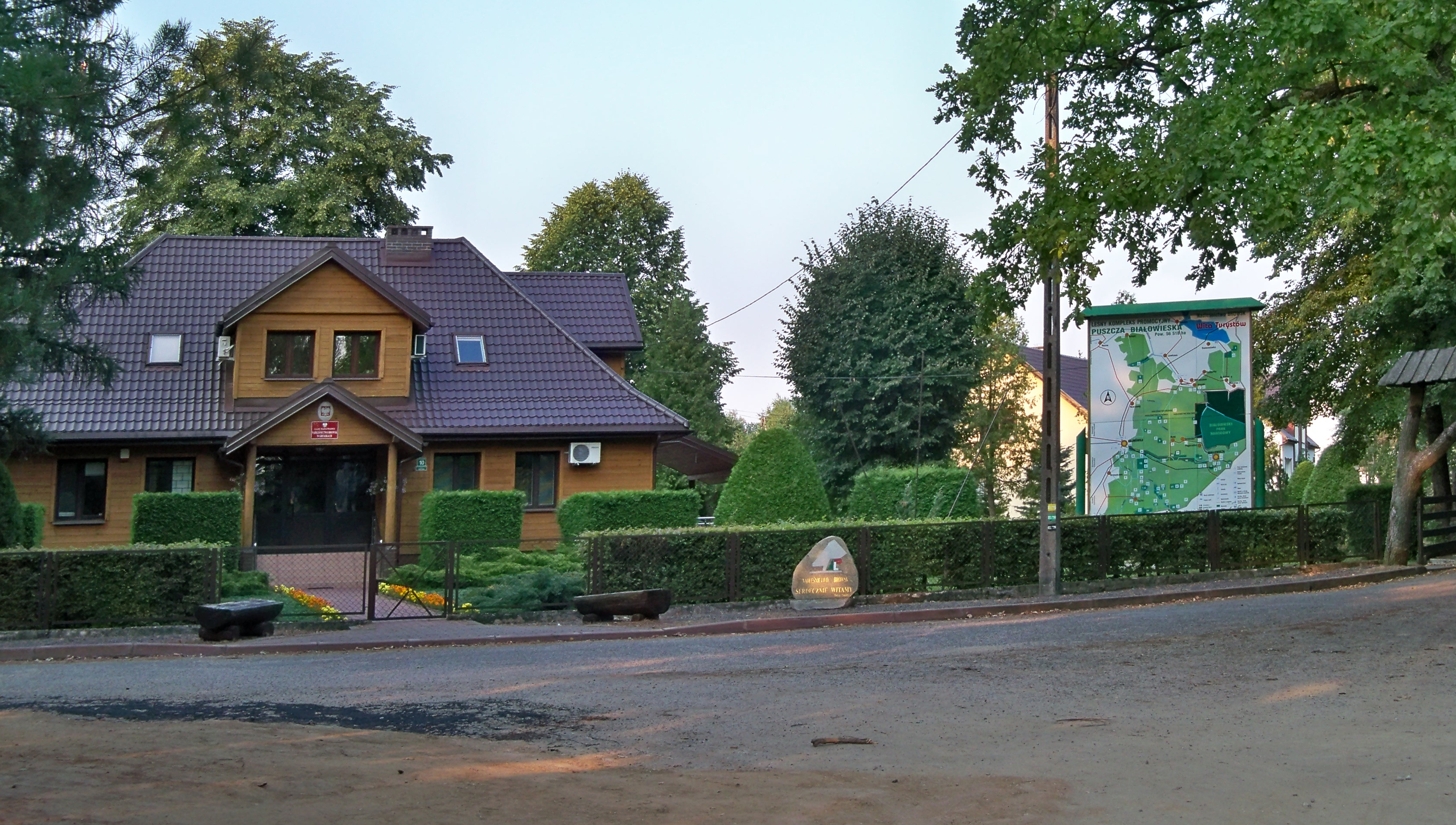
- Forestry in Gruszki

- Location within Poland
- Coordinates: 52°49′40″N 23°47′58″E
- Country: Poland
- Voivodeship: Podlaskie
- County: Hajnówka
- Gmina: Narewka
- Time zone: UTC+1 (CET)
  - Summer (DST): UTC+2 (CEST)

Gruszki [ˈɡruʂki] is a settlement, part of the village of Guszczewina, in the administrative district of Gmina Narewka, within Hajnówka County, Podlaskie Voivodeship, in north-eastern Poland, close to the border with Belarus.

During the German occupation of Poland (World War II), the German Police Battalion 322 expelled the inhabitants, and then plundered and destroyed the settlement (see Nazi crimes against the Polish nation). After the war the village was rebuilt.

In Gruszki there is a memorial to Danuta Siedzikówna, member of the Polish resistance movement in World War II and the anti-communist resistance movement, national heroine of Poland. There is also a monument commemorating the Millennium of Poland.
