= Brunon Tymiński =

Polish engineer and technologist

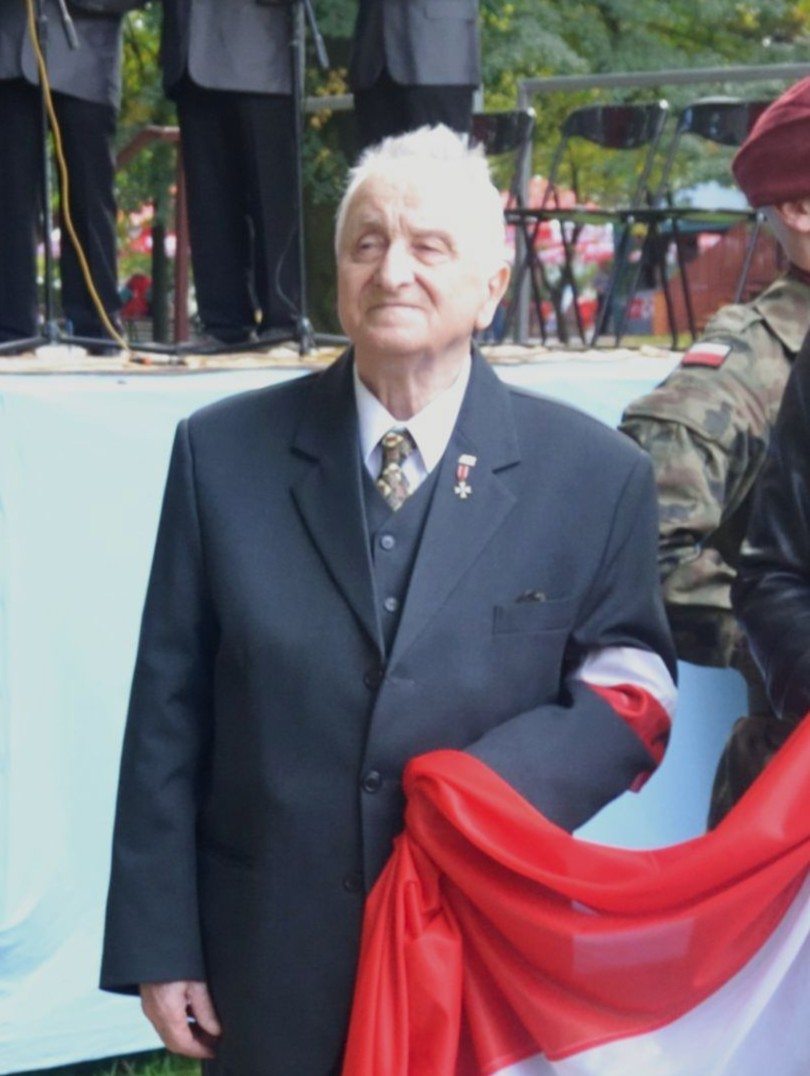
- Born: 15 April 1924; Harasimowicze, Poland
- Died: 21 June 2020 (aged 96); Ełk, Poland
- Occupations: Engineer, technologist
- Known for: Development of industrial production at ZWOK A-26 in Ełk
- Awards: Order of Polonia Restituta; Gold Cross of Merit; Silver Cross of Merit

Brunon Tymiński (15 April 1924 Harasimowicze – 21 June 2020 Ełk) was a Polish engineer and technologist associated with the state industrial sector of the Polish People's Republic. He was a long-time employee of the Communication Equipment Factory (Zakłady Wytwórcze Osprzętu Komunikacyjnego - ZWOK A-26) in Ełk, where he held senior technical and managerial positions.

== Career ==
Tymiński graduated from the Szczecin University of Technology in 1950. He subsequently worked in state-owned industry for nearly four decades. On 2 June 1958, he joined ZWOK A-26 in Ełk..

He was initially employed as chief constructor-technologist and in 1963 was appointed deputy director for technology and development. In this role, he contributed to the modernization and expansion of the plant’s production capacity, including the upgrading of industrial equipment and the reorganization of technical departments.

During his tenure, the enterprise introduced new types of industrial production, including lighting components and electrical elements such as galvanizing resistors. He was involved in the implementation of production lines for wiring harnesses and cables for the Polish-licensed automobile Fiat 125p, overseeing technical documentation and production processes.

In later years, he participated in the introduction of licensed technologies for wiring systems used in motor vehicles and agricultural machinery.

Under his co-management, the plant increased production significantly compared to the late 1950s and expanded its export activity.

== Technical and innovation activity ==
Tymiński was involved in the rationalization and innovation movement within the enterprise. He developed technical solutions, including a galvanizing resistor, and submitted a number of improvement proposals aimed at increasing efficiency and reducing production costs.

He also took part in initiatives to improve production processes, technological standards, and organizational efficiency. As part of his professional duties, he undertook foreign technical visits.

== Social activity ==
Tymiński was active in local civic life in Ełk. He participated in community and workplace initiatives and served as a lay judge at the District Court in Ełk.

He was also involved in activities organized by state-affiliated civic institutions during the period of the Polish People's Republic.

In his later years, Brunon served as president of the Ełk branch of the World Association of Home Army Soldiers (ŚZŻAK), an organization uniting former members of the Polish Home Army, their descendants, and individuals dedicated to preserving the memory and legacy of the wartime resistance movement

== Awards and honors ==
- Knight’s Cross of the Order of Polonia Restituta (1985)
- Gold Cross of Merit (1970)
- Silver Cross of Merit (1964)
- Award of the Committee for Science and Technology (1969)
- Award of the Minister of Science, Higher Education and Technology (1973)
- Suwałki Voivode’s Prize (1980)

== Personal life ==
He was a grandson of Herman Tymiński and Karol Rzepecki. He was also an uncle of Danuta Siedzikówna (“Inka”) and her sister Wiesława Korzeń.
