= Heart for Inka =

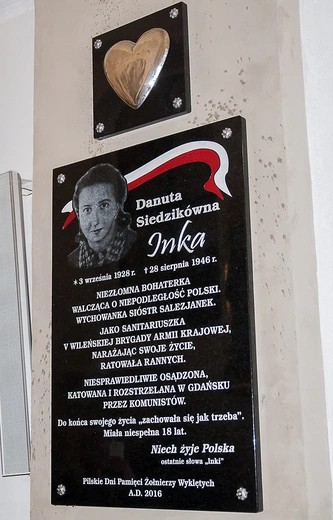
Heart for Inka in Piła

Heart for Inka This is a campaign to commemorate the heroic Home Army nurse, Danuta Siedzikówna "Inka". The hearts are silver from donations and contain earth from Inka's grave. The action aims to shape society's heroic, leadership and patriotic attitudes, especially among young women.

== History ==
The 'Heart for Inka' action properly honours Danuta Siedzikówna-Inka and remembers her story. 'Inka' is a symbolic figure called "the nurse of the elite soldiers". The idea for the commemoration originated in Gdańsk when Prof. Krzysztof Szwagrzyk 's team searched for Inka's remains as part of the Institute of National Remembrance 's activities. Rev. Wąsowicz took part in the work as a volunteer. When Inka was found, Father Wąsowicz took some soil from her grave because, for the Salesians, Inka is an icon of youth. After the earth was transported to Piła, the idea was to collect as much silver as possible, melt it down and create an urn into which the world from the place where Inka's remains were found would be poured. A collection of silver for the urn of Inka was announced at the Holy Family parish. The unveiling of the first plaque and the silver heart with Inka's ashes took place on 1 March 2016 in Holy Family Church in Piła.

== Commemoration - Unveiling of Hearts for Inka ==
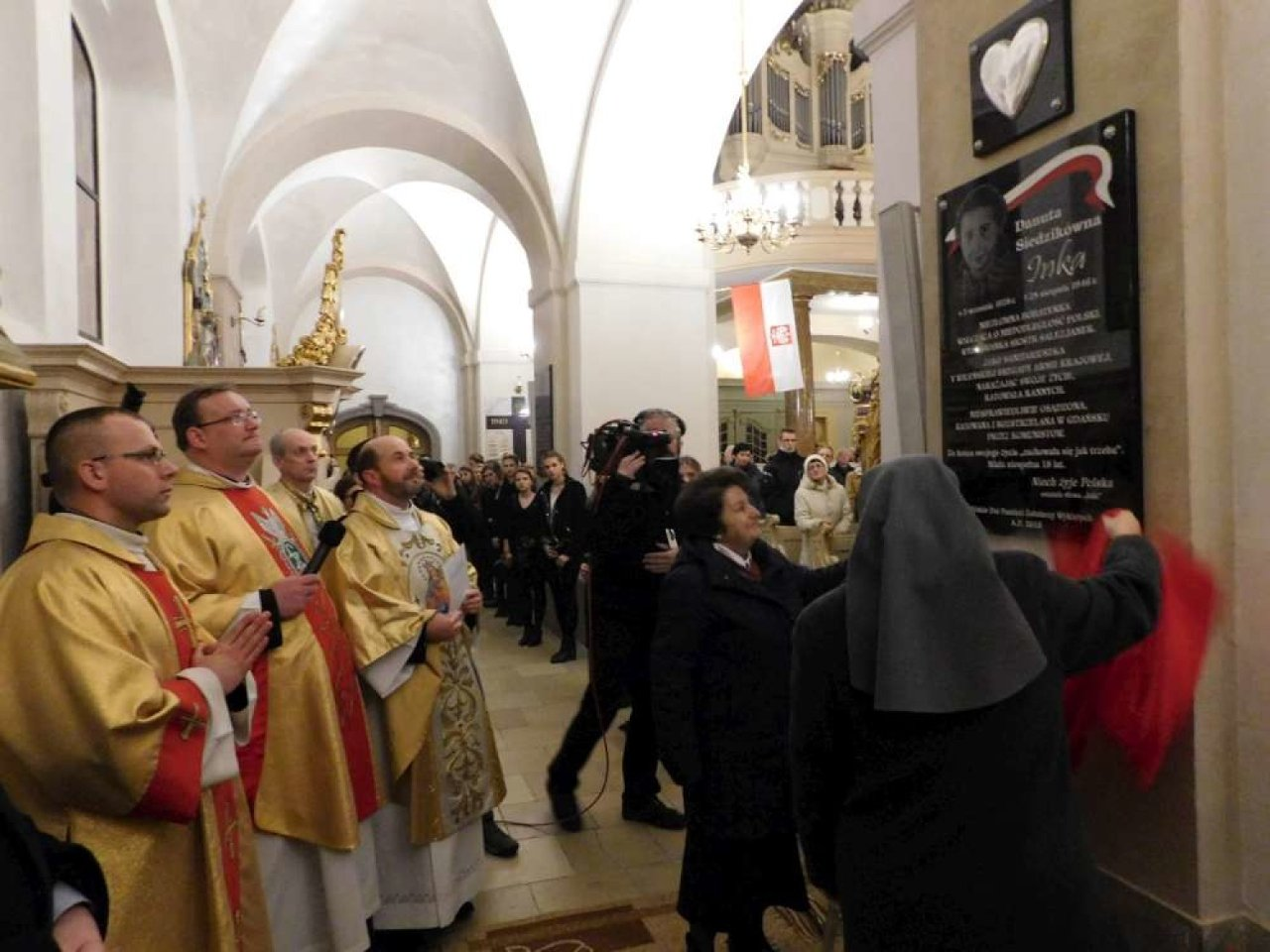
Heart for Inka in Pila

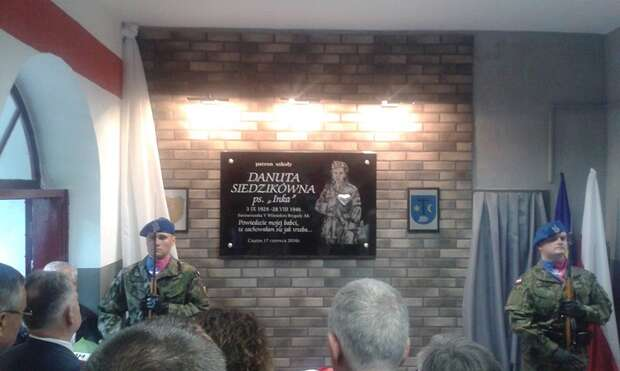
Heart for Inka in Czarne
- 01.03.2016 Holy Family Church Piła.
- 17.06.2016 Danuta Siedzikówna pseud. ‘Inka’ Primary and Middle School Czarne.
- 05.03.2017 Church of Our Lady Queen of Families - Dziekanów Leśny (Łomianki).
- 22.10.2017 St. Zygmunt's Parish in Warsaw
- 01.03.2018 St. Faustyna Church Groszowice (Jedlnia-Letnisko).
- 16.06.2018 Danuta Siedzikówna ‘Inka’ Primary School Stare Drzewce.
- 21.07.2018 St. Michael the Archangel Church Butrymańce Lithuania
- 30.09.2018 Sanctuary of Our Lady of Victory Ossów ko Warsaw
- 24.02.2019 St. Nicholas Church Grudziądz
- 25.08.2019 St. Catherine Church Starogard Gdański.
- 03.09.2019 Salesian School Complex Ostróda
- 29.09.2019 Church of the parish of Divine Mercy Gostynin
- 13.09.2020 Church of Our Lady of Fatima Dębno.
- 28.02.2021 St. Mark's Church Bydgoszcz
- 17.09.2021 St. Martin's Church Sarnowo.
- 01.03.2022|28.08.2024 St. John Bosco Church Gdańsk Orunia.
- 07.01.2023 Sanctuary of Our Lady of Częstochowa on Jasna Góra Częstochowa.
- 01.03.2023 Basilica of St. Brigid Gdańsk.
- 10.05.2023 Salesian Schools Toruń
- 03.09.2023 Museum of Cursed Soldiers and Political Prisoners of the Polish People's Republic Warsaw.
- 25.02.2024 St. Stanisław Kostka Church Płock
- 01.03.2024 Church of the Annunciation of the Blessed Virgin Mary Białystok.
- 20.09.2024 Divine Mercy Community in Šalčininkai. Gift from former activists of the Fighting Youth Federation.
- 28.02.2025 Salesian Schools Szczecin
- 02.03.2025 Church of the Holy Family Słupsk.
- 28.09.2025 Marian Sanctuary in Różanystok where Herman Tymiński great-grandfather of Inka was priest.
- 04.12.2025 Parish of St. Barbara in Sikórz
- 07.12.2025 Sanctuary of Blessed Cardinal Stefan Wyszyński in Kobylanka
- 27.02.2026 Salesian Schools in Mińsk Mazowiecki
- 05.03.2026 Salesian School Complex „Don Bosco” in Wrocław
- 17.03.2026 Parish of St. Maximilian Maria Kolbe in Białystok
- 22.05.2026 Stefan Żeromski Primary School in Swarożyn
