= Wiesław Grzebisz =

Polish economist and industrial manager

Wiesław Bohdan Grzebisz
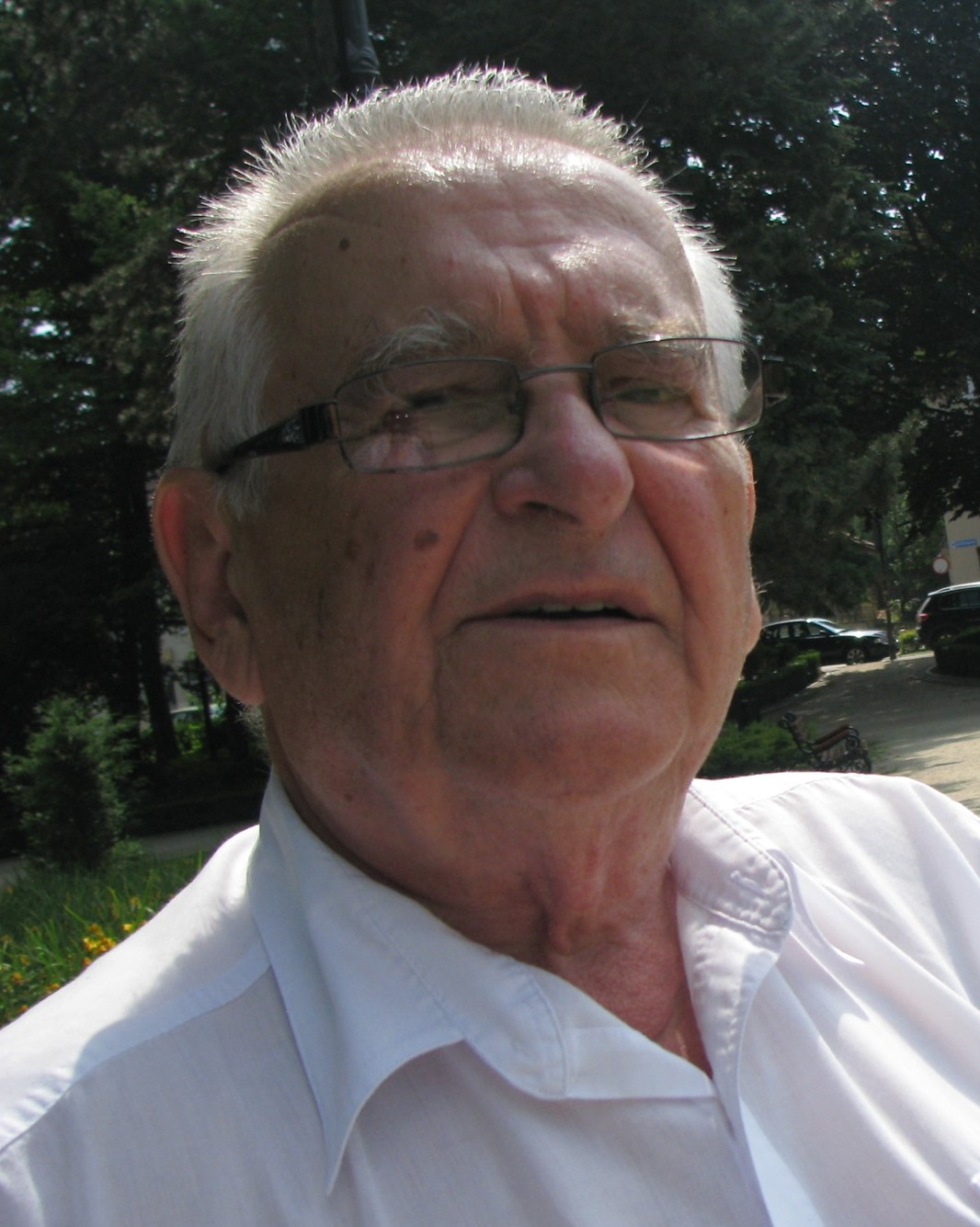
- Wiesław Grzebisz
- Born: April 14, 1933; Olchówka, Poland
- Died: February 9, 2023 (aged 89); Wrocław, Poland
- Occupations: Economist, industrial manager
- Awards: Order of Polonia Restituta; Gold Cross of Merit

Wiesław Bohdan Grzebisz (14 April 1933 Olchówka – 9 February 2023 Wrocław) was a Polish economist and industrial manager associated with the state-owned industrial sector in the Polish People's Republic. He held senior managerial and economic positions at the PZL-Hydral industrial complex.

== Career ==
Grzebisz began his professional career in 1955. On 31 December 1968, he joined the PZL-Hydral industrial combine, where he initially served as plenipotentiary to the General Director and later as Chief Economist.

In 1970, he was appointed deputy director for Economic and Commercial Affairs. In this position, he was responsible for economic planning, supply and distribution, and the financial performance of the enterprise.

Grzebisz was involved in addressing economic and organizational challenges related to supply, production efficiency, and distribution within the PZL-Hydral combine. His work focused on improving economic performance, including cost control, efficient use of resources, and production optimization.

He also oversaw matters related to employee welfare and social provisions within the enterprise.

== Awards and honours ==
- Knight's Cross of the Order of Polonia Restituta
- Gold Cross of Merit, awarded by Resolution of the Council of State of 30 October 1975

== Personal life ==
He was the grandson of Paweł Siedzik (1861–1912) and Aniela Kiejno (1872–1951) (daughter of Eleonora Kiejno née Mackiewicz). He was also the cousin of Danuta Siedzikówna and her sister Wiesława Korzeń as well as Paweł Hur.
