= Leon Leyson =

Polish-American author

- Born: Leib Lejzon; September 15, 1929; Narewka, Poland
- Died: January 12, 2013 (aged 83); Whittier, California, U.S.
- Citizenship: American
- Education: Pepperdine University; Los Angeles City College; Los Angeles State College
- Occupation: Teacher
- Notable work: The Boy on the Wooden Box: How the Impossible Became Possible . . . on Schindler's List
- Spouse: Elisabeth 'Lis' B. Leyson (m. 1965)
- Children: 2

Leon Leyson (born Leib Lejzon; September 15, 1929 – January 12, 2013) was a Polish-American Holocaust survivor and one of the youngest Schindlerjuden, Jews saved by Oskar Schindler. His posthumously published memoir, The Boy on the Wooden Box- How the impossible became the possible, on Schindler's List details his survival during the times of the Holocaust.

== Leyson's Life ==
=== Early life ===
Leyson was born Leib Lejzon in Narewka, Poland to Moshe Lejzon and Chanah Lejzon (née Golner) on September 15, 1929. He had four siblings: Hershel, Betzalel (called Tsalig), Pesza, and David. He also had a large extended family. He and his family members were all observant Jews. The Lejzons were also farmers, and came from an ancestry of farming. Narewka was a small town, with only one car and little to no access to electricity. Leyson later recalled there being some division between Jews and gentiles in Narewka, including antisemitic jokes, or being chased away from a place for being a Jew on Christian holidays.

In 1938, the Lejzons moved to Kraków for better job opportunities. Leib began to experience overt antisemitism for the first time attending public school in Kraków. A year later, Germany invaded Poland and soon after began placing restrictions on Jews. Moshe Lejzon was arrested by the Germans and held without charges for three months before being released.

=== The Holocaust ===
After the invasion, Hershel fled back to the family's home village of Narewka, then occupied by the Soviet Union. In 1941, he and the rest of the town's Jews, including most of the Leysons' extended family members, were massacred by the Nazis when they invaded. The Lejzons only found out about their deaths after the war ended.

Six months after the German army entered Kraków, the area's Jews were ordered to leave their homes and move into the Kraków Ghetto. Lejzon's father, Moshe, and his brother David began working for Oskar Schindler at his enamelware factory soon after. Channah, Leib and Pesza were covered under Moshe's pass until they found work, sparing them from deportation to an extermination camp.

Tsalig Lejzon was unable to get an employment pass, and was put on a train for deportation, most likely to the Bełżec extermination camp. Schindler, who was already at the station having some of his workers taken off the train, recognized him and offered to have him taken off as well. Tsalig refused, as he did not want to leave his girlfriend. It is assumed that neither of them survived, likely being murdered shortly after arrival in Bełżec or a similar camp.

In 1943, the Kraków Ghetto was liquidated by Nazi authorities. Those who survived and were not sent to extermination camps were sent to the newly built Kraków-Płaszów concentration camp under the notorious commandant Amon Göth, who Leib encountered on more than one occasion. Moshe managed to get Leib and Channah transferred out of Płaszów to Schindler's factory, where they remained in relative safety for almost a year.

In 1944, Leib and his surviving family members were placed on the famous Schindler's list. Leib's number on the list was 69128. The male Schindlerjuden, including Leib, David and Moshe, were transferred from Płaszów to the Gross-Rosen concentration camp for a few days before being sent on to Schindler's new camp, Brünnlitz in the Protectorate of Bohemia and Moravia, part of occupied Czechoslovakia. Leib was so traumatized by the experience that later he could not recall if they had spent days, weeks, or months there. The female Schindlerjuden, including Channah and Pesza, were sent to Auschwitz–Birkenau where they spent a harrowing few weeks before Schindler bribed Nazi officials into releasing them to Brünnlitz.

Despite Schindler and his wife, Emilie's efforts to care for the workers, food was in short supply at Brünnlitz. Oskar Schindler was fond of Leib, calling him "Little Lejzon". He arranged for him to have extra rations, which Leib shared with his family. Schindler also had Leib transferred to easier work and had him taken off the night shift. On May 9, 1945, a few days after the guards, and then Schindler had fled, a lone Russian soldier arrived to announce that they were liberated.

=== Later life ===
After the Red Army liberated Brünnlitz, the Lejzons briefly returned to Kraków, before Leib and his parents left for a displaced persons camp in Wetzlar, American-occupied Germany. This is where they heard that the rest of the family in their hometown of Narewka, including their eldest son, the grands-parents (Chanah's parents), and all the uncles, aunts and cousins, had been killed in 1941. Realizing they could not go back, in 1949, Lejzon and his parents immigrated to the United States, where they changed their family name to Leyson and Leib adopted the name Leon. His surviving siblings, David and Pesza (who changed her name to Aviva), immigrated first to Czechoslovakia and then settled in Israel.

In 1951, Leyson was drafted and served as an engineer in the US Army in Okinawa, Japan for sixteen months during the Korean War. He began teaching at Huntington Park High School in 1958. He met his wife, Elisabeth Burns, in January 1965. They married that year in July.

Leyson studied industrial arts at Los Angeles City College and received a bachelor's degree from Los Angeles State College in 1958. He then earned a Master of Education from Pepperdine University in 1970. He taught tech ed and was a guidance counselor at Huntington Park High School for 39 years, before his retirement in 1997. In 2011 he was awarded an honorary doctorate in humane letters from Chapman University.

In 1972, he met his savior Oskar Schindler one last time at a reunion of survivors in Los Angeles, before Schindler's death in 1974. Leyson was not sure Schindler would remember him, but he recognized him immediately, saying "I know who you are, you're Little Leyson!"

Leyson kept quiet about his experiences during the Holocaust until the release of the film Schindler's List, and the public interest that followed. He began speaking publicly about his experiences to audiences around the United States and Canada. He was a member of Rodgers Center for Holocaust Education Advisory Board at Chapman University.

=== Death and legacy ===
Leyson died on January 12, 2013, of cutaneous t-cell lymphoma in Fullerton, California. He was survived by his two children, six grandchildren and his wife, Elisabeth B. Leyson. His book about his Holocaust experiences, The Boy on the Wooden Box, was published after his death with the help of his wife. The book was coauthored by Elisabeth B. Leyson and Holocaust scholar Dr. Marilyn J. Harran. The title came from Leyson, at age 13, needing to stand on a wooden box to reach the machinery in the factory at Brünnlitz. The book was successful, becoming a New York Times Best Seller. It also won a Christopher Award.

== Writing ==
- The Boy on the Wooden Box: How the Impossible Became Possible . . . on Schindler's List. Atheneum Books for Young Readers, 2015
