= Danuta Siedzikówna =

Polish anti-communist resistance member

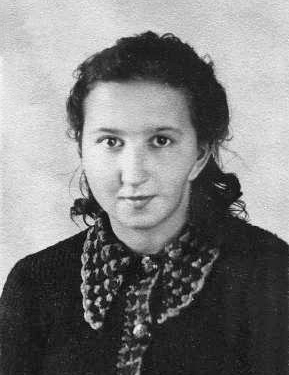
- Danuta Siedzikówna
- Nickname: Inka
- Born: Danuta Siedzikówna; 3 September 1928; Guszczewina, Poland
- Died: 28 August 1946 (aged 17) Gdańsk, Republic of Poland
- Allegiance: Poland
- Rank: combat medic second lieutenant (podporucznik)
- Conflicts: World War II
- Awards: Order of Polonia Restituta

Danuta Helena Siedzikówna (nom de guerre: Inka; underground name: Danuta Obuchowicz; 3 September 1928 – 28 August 1946) was a Polish medical orderly in the 4th Squadron of the 5th Wilno Brigade of the Home Army. In 1946 she served with the Brigade's 1st Squadron in Poland's Pomerania region. Considered a national heroine, she was captured, tortured and sentenced to death at the age of 17 by the communist authorities.

== Early life ==
Siedzikówna was born on 3 September 1928 in Guszczewina, near Narewka, Bielsk Podlaski. Her father, Wacław Siedzik, was a forester sent to Siberia under the Tsar for involvement in pro-Polish independence organisations. He came back to Poland in 1923. In 1940 he was arrested by the NKVD and once again deported to Russia.

In 1941 her father Wacław Siedzik joined Władysław Anders' Polish Army (he died in Teheran in 1943). Her mother, Eugenia, née Tymińska, was a member of the Home Army and was killed by the Gestapo in September 1943. She was the granddaughter of engineer Jan Tyminski and the great-granddaughter of the Orthodox priest Herman Tymiński and Karl Rjepetsky, a Russian Lieutenant Colonel whose body was discovered in Ardahan in 2017.

The son of Waclaw's sister, Paweł Hur, finished the Polish Air Force Academy in Dęblin and took part in Battle of Britain. Siedzikówna grew up with her siblings Wiesława (17.03.1927–29.06.2004) and Irena Laska (19.02.1931 - 02.04.1978) in the forester's lodge near Guszczewina. After their father was exiled, they moved to Narewka. The girls attended grammar school in Narewka until 1939. During the Second World War, until 1943 all three girls studied in the Salesian Sisters School in Różanystok near Dąbrowa Białostocka.

== Second World War and thereafter ==
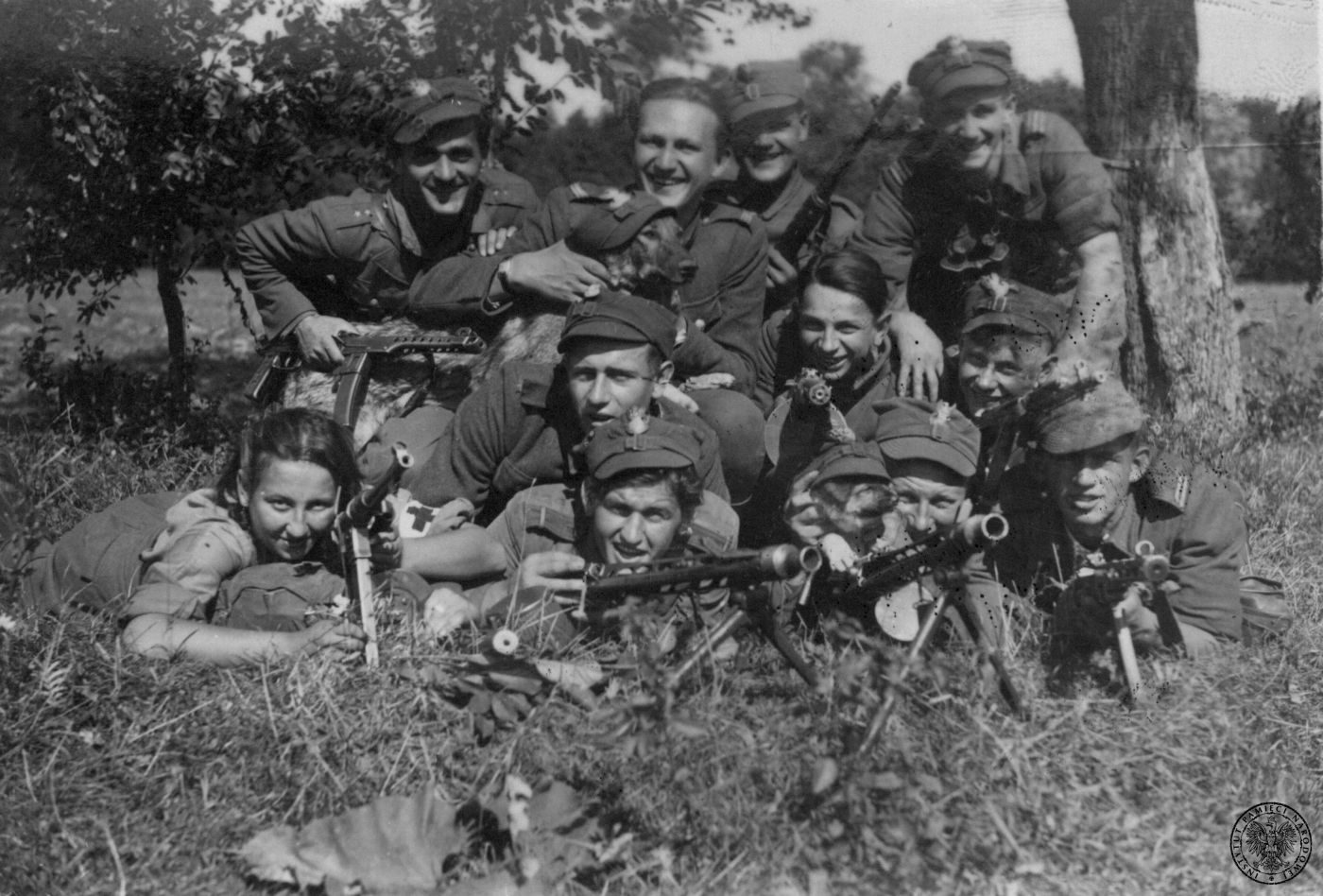
Danuta Siedzikówna in military unit

After their mother was murdered by the Gestapo in Białystok, together with her sister Wiesława, Danuta joined the Home Army in late 1943 or early 1944. As part of the underground army's training, she acquired medical skills. After the Soviets took Białystok from the German Nazis, she started work as a clerk in the forest inspectorate in Hajnówka.

With other employees of the inspectorate, she was arrested in June 1945 by NKVD and UB for collaboration with the anticommunist underground. She was liberated from a prison transport convoy by a patrol of a Wilno group of ex-Home Army partisans commanded by Stanisław Wołonciej "Konus", a subordinate of Zygmunt Szendzielarz, "Łupaszko", who were operating in the area. "Konus" took the freed prisoners to "Łupaszko"'s camp where some of them, including Danuta, joined his group. Subsequently, Siedzikówna served as a medical orderly in the "Konus" troop, and then in the squadron of lieutenant Jan Mazur, "Piast", and that of lieutenant Marian Płuciński, "Mścisław". For a short period, her superior was also lieutenant Leon Beynar "Nowina", deputy of "Łupaszko", later known as "Paweł Jasienica" - a notable Polish historian and writer. During this time Danuta assumed the pseudonym "Inka".

The "Łupaszko" brigade was dissolved in September 1945 and Danuta went back to work in the forest inspectorate in Miłomłyn in Ostróda County under the name "Danuta Obuchowicz". However, the brigade was re-mobilized in response to Communist repressions in January 1946. In the early spring of 1946 Danuta came into contact with second lieutenant Zdzisław Badocha "Żelazny", the commander of one of Łupaszko's squadrons. After "Żelazny"'s death, the new commander, second lieutenant Olgierd Christa "Leszek", ordered Danuta to travel to Gdańsk in order to collect medical supplies.

She was arrested by the UB again on 20 July 1946 in Gdańsk. While in prison she was tortured and beaten but refused to disclose any information about her contacts in the anti-communist underground and their meeting points. Danuta's brutal interrogations were personally supervised by the Head of the Investigations Department at the Voivodeship Office for Public Security, (WUBP), (Polish Secret Police) in Gdańsk, Józef Bik, vel Jozef Gawerski, vel Jozef Bukar.

In 1968, Bik, vel Bukar emigrated to Sweden, claiming antisemitic persecution. An IPN indictment against Bik, vel Gawerski, vel Bukar reads: "Jozef B. is accused of participating in court-sanctioned murders perpetrated against members of Polish Democratic Forces (pol. Polskie Siły Demokratyczne) and Polish Secret Army (pol. Polska Armia Tajna) whom he was beating and torturing in order to extract confessions".

== Trial and death ==
She was charged with taking an active, violent part in an attack on functionaries of the Ministry of Public Security (Polish secret police) and the Milicja Obywatelska near the village Podjazy as part of the Łupaszko unit, despite the fact that she was only a medic. She was accused of shooting at policemen and even issuing orders to other partisans. However, the testimony submitted by MO and UB members involved in the fight was at best contradictory, as some claimed to have seen her shooting and giving orders, while others denied it altogether. One, named Mieczysław Mazur, testified that Siedzikówna had given him first aid after he was wounded by other partisans. She was charged with killing wounded policemen, a charge contradicted during her trial. The court decided she had not played a direct part in the attack.

Despite this and Siedzikówna's age (17), the court still sentenced her to death. The president of People's Republic of Poland, Boleslaw Bierut refused to grant her clemency (the request was submitted by Siedzikówna's public defender, which the prisoner herself refused to sign). Siedzikówna was executed (along with Feliks Selmanowicz, whose nom de guerre was "Zagończyk"), six days before her 18th birthday, on 28 August 1946, in a Gdańsk prison.

Days before the execution a secret letter from Inka was smuggled out of the prison, where she wrote: "Please tell my grandmother, that I have acted right."

The last minutes of her life are known from the testimony of Father Marian Prusak, the priest-chaplain called to give "Inka" and "Zagończyk" the last rites. According to Father Prusak, both prisoners were calm before their execution. Siedzikówna, after taking the Sacrament of Penance, asked the priest to inform her family of her death and gave him their address. Afterward the two were executed in the basement of the prison, tied to wooden stakes. They both refused blindfolds. When the prosecutor gave the order for the execution squad to fire, both prisoners simultaneously shouted (in Polish) "Long Live Poland!" She remained alive and the coup de grâce was delivered by Franciszek Sawicki (other members of the firing squad refused to do so) after she yelled "Long live Łupaszko!"

Her Protocol of Execution was signed by: Major Wiktor Suchacki (prosecutor), 2nd Lt. Franciszek Sawicki (firing squad leader), Captain Mieczysław Rutkowski (attending physician), and Jan Wójcik (jail warden). The location of her remains remained unknown until 2014. They were discovered due to a nation-wide programme launched by the Institute of National Remembrance in 2003. The remains were confirmed as Siedzikówna's via DNA testing in 2015. On 28 August 2016, a state burial attended by President Andrzej Duda, was held in Gdańsk at the Garrison Cemetery for Siedzikówna and one of her companions.

== Later events ==
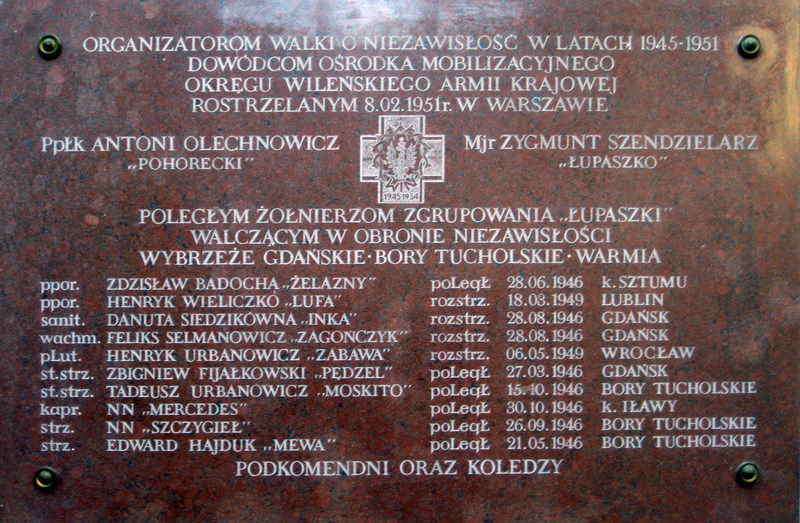
Memorial Plaque for AK Soldiers in Gdańsk Basilica

Father Prusak did deliver the news of Siedzikówna's death to her family, although they had already found out through other sources. Unknown to him, he was under UB surveillance, and in 1949 was charged with "espionage" for informing Danuta's family about her death. For that alone, he spent three and a half years in prison.

After the fall of communism in Poland, the main Stalinist prosecutor in Danuta's trial who demanded the death penalty, Wacław Krzyżanowski, was brought up on charges of judicial murder twice (in 1993 and 2001). However, both times he was declared innocent of the charges. (Krzyżanowski argued that he had been only marginally involved with the case.)

== Awards and recognition ==
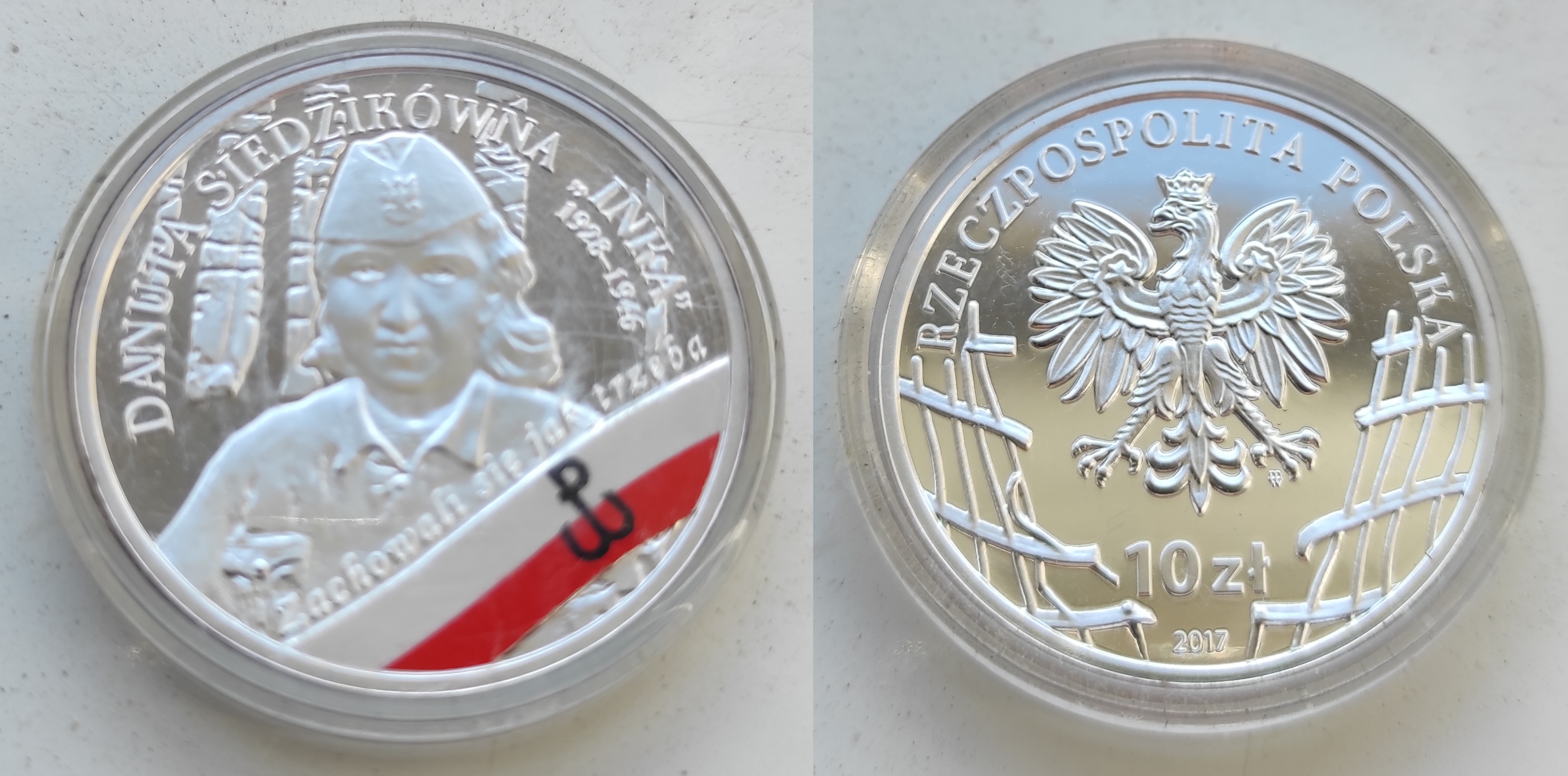
Coin of Danuta Siedzikówna

On Polish Independence Day (11 November) 2006, President Lech Kaczyński posthumously awarded Danuta Siedzikówna the Commander's Cross of the Order of Polonia Restituta.

The President of the Republic of Poland, Andrzej Duda, issued a decree appointing Danuta Siedzikówna to the first officer rank posthumously.

In 2017, the National Bank of Poland (NBP) introduced a 10-zloty silver commemorative coin, as part of the "Cursed Soldiers" series, in honour of Danuta Siedzikówna.

Since 2017 Danuta Siedzikówna is included in the Polish national school curriculum as a symbol of anti-communist resistance.

== Cultural references ==
=== Film ===
- In January 2007, a film about Siedzikówna's last days, Inka 1946. Ja jedna zginę, featuring actress Karolina Kominek-Skuratowicz in the title role, was released by Teleplay.
- In 2015, the TVP channel produced a documentary film Inka. Zachowałam się jak trzeba, directed by Arkadiusz Gołebiewski, portraying the life of Danuta Siedzikówna.

=== Music ===
- In 2012, Polish hip-hop artist Tadek released a single "Inka" on his album Niewygodna prawda ("Inconvenient Truth") to pay tribute to the memory of Danuta Siedzikówna.
- In 2013, Panny wyklęte, a music project by Dariusz Malejonek in collaboration with Polish singers including Marika, Natalia Przybysz and Halina Mlynkova devoted to the contribution of female members of the anti-communist movement, included singles "Walczyk" and "Jedna chwila" dedicated to Danuta Siedzikówna.

=== Theatre ===
- In 2000, Tomasz A. Żak, working for the Nie Teraz Theatre, directed a stage play entitled Na etapie dedicated to the life of Danuta Siedzikówna.

=== Poetry ===
- A poem entitled "Inka" appears in the 2011 poetry book Ars Lublinica by Katarzyna Bednarska.

== Patronage ==
- Inka Park in Sopot (Polish: Park im. sanitariuszki Inki)
- Grammary School in Podjazy
- Gymnasium no 2 in Ostrołęka
- Danuta Siedzikówna "Inka" High School no I in Wrocław
- Technikum no 3 in Kielce
- 3 Sokólska Drużyna Wędrownicza ZHP
- 95 Tomaszowska Drużyna Harcerek "SZAROTKA ZHP belonged to Headquarters Hufiec ZHP in Piotrków Trybunalski
- 1 Ostrołęcka Drużyna Harcerek "Ignis ZHR
- 37 Gdyńska Drużyna Harcerek "Biedronki ZHR
- 44 Mazowiecka Drużyna Harcerek "Kasjopea ZHR in Warsaw

== Memorials ==
- Memorial plaque in St. Mary's Church, Gdańsk
- Memorial in Park imienia Sanitariuszki Inki, Sopot
- Monument at the Piotr Skarga Catholic High School, Warsaw
- Memorial near Narewka parish church
- Symbolic grave at the Garrison Cemetery, Gdańsk
- Monument in Jordan Park, Kraków
- Monument in Planty Park, Białystok
- Heart for Inka silver hearts memorials
- Monument to the Unbroken Soldiers in American Czestochowa
- Commemorative plaque, Butrimonys (Lithuania)
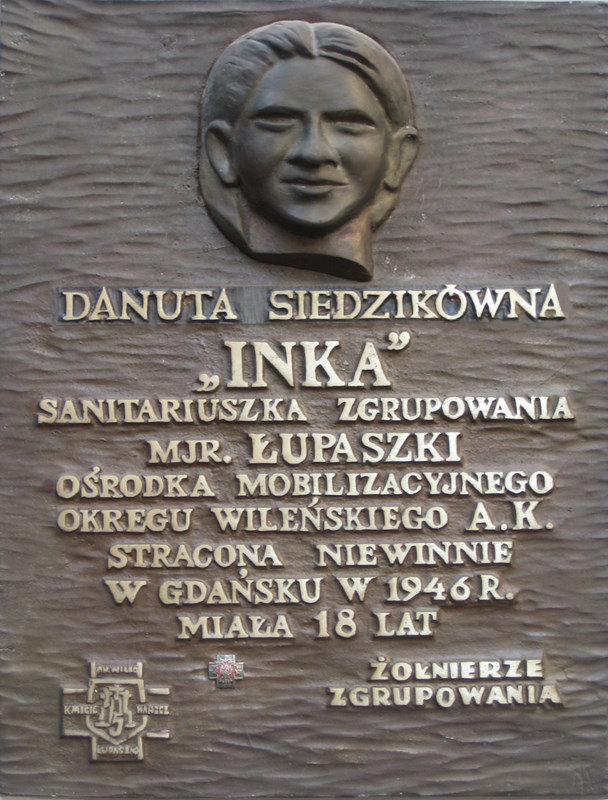
Memorial plaque in Gdańsk catedral

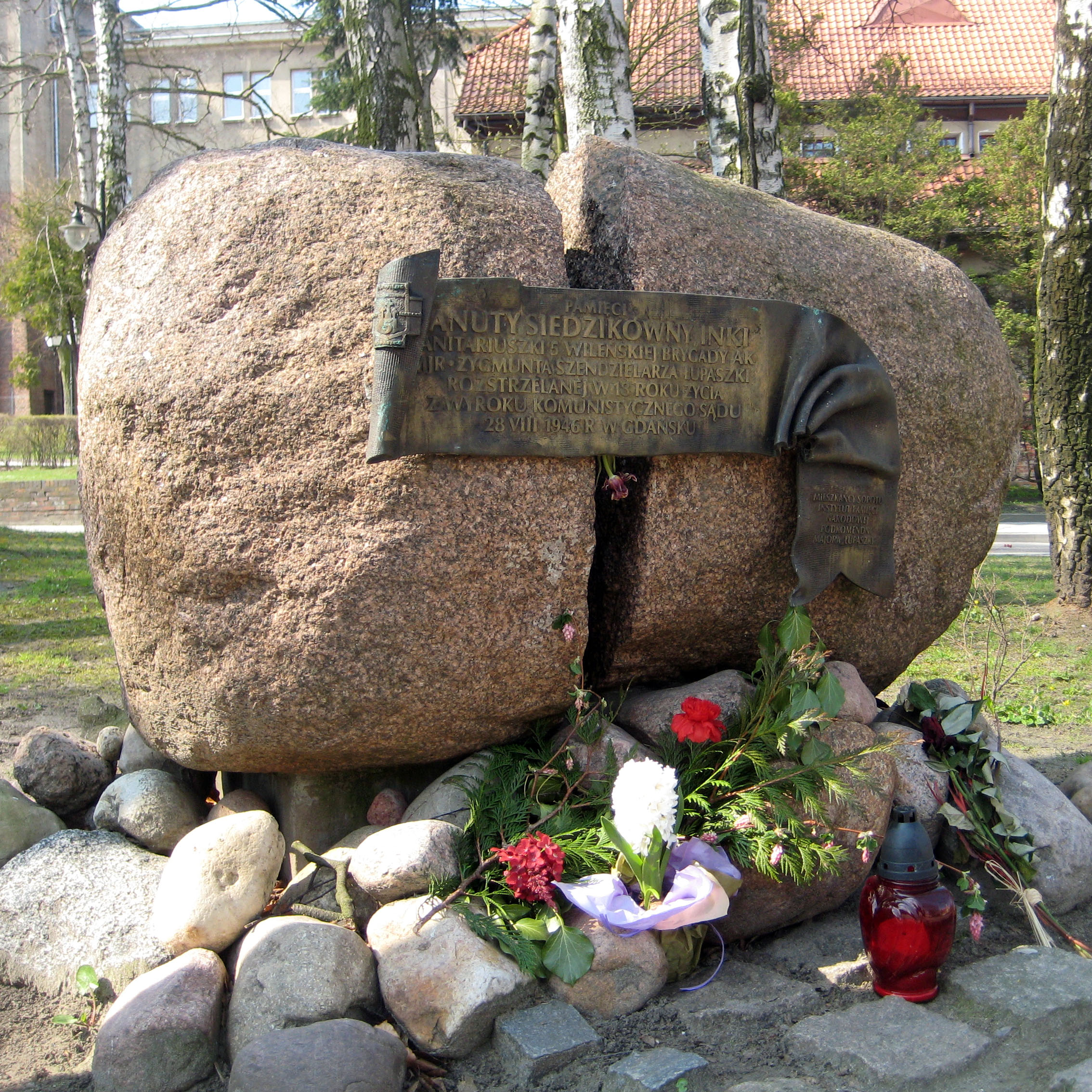
Memorial in Park imienia Sanitariuszki Inki in Sopot

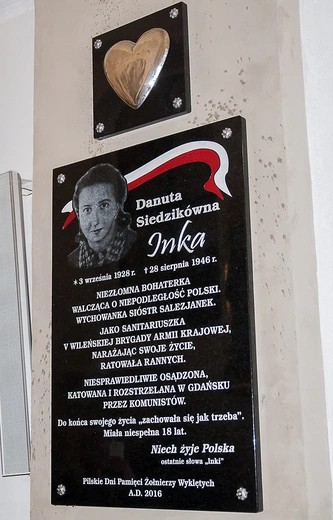
Heart for Inka in Piła

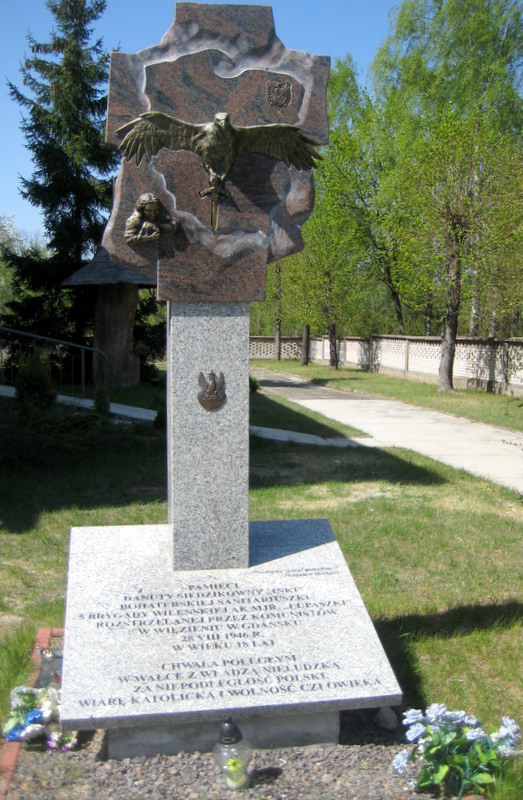
Memorial near Narewka parish church

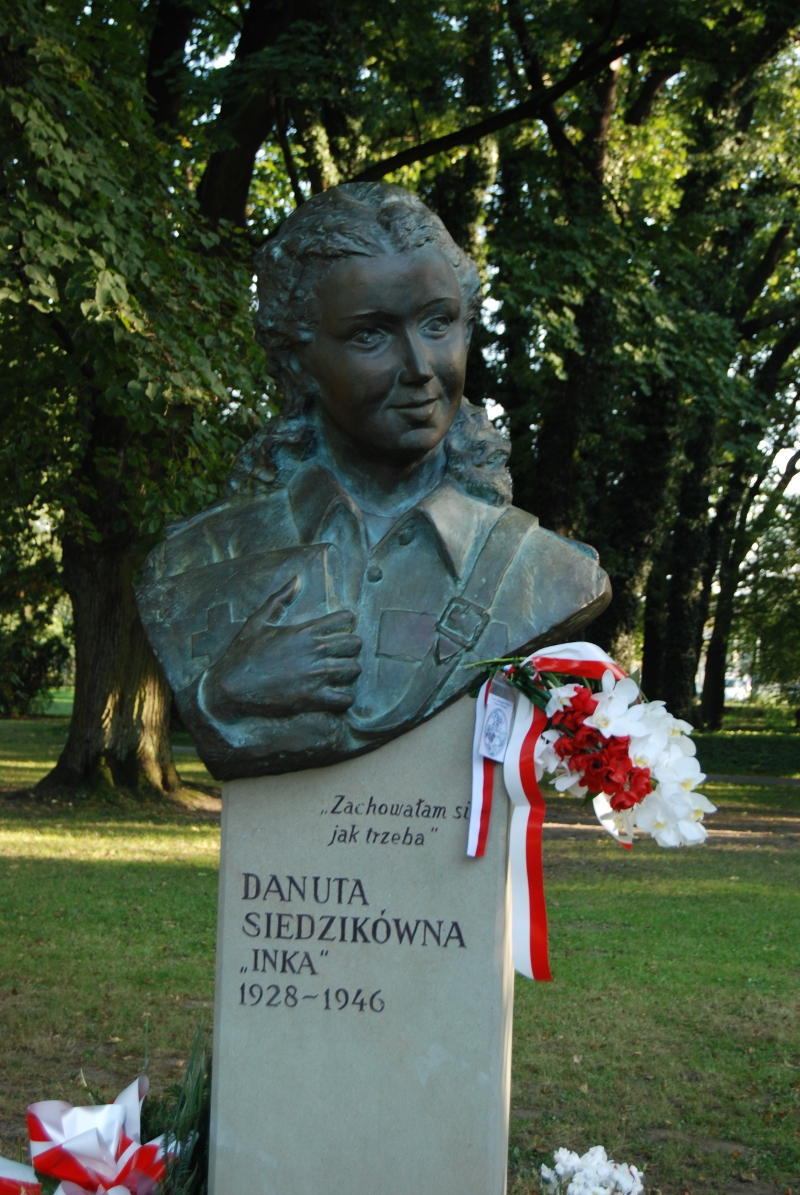
Monument in Jordan Park in Kraków

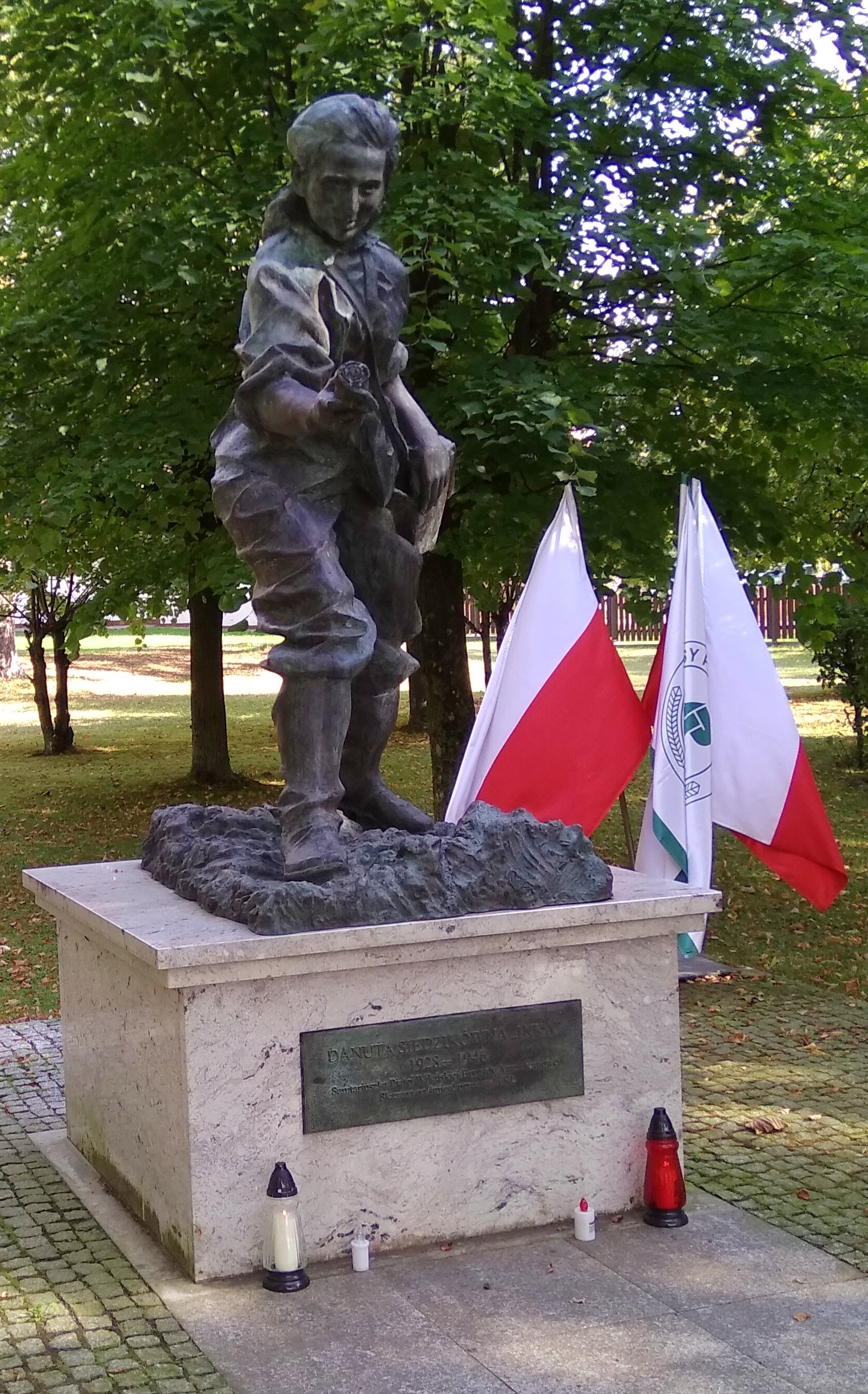
Danuta Siedzikówna monument at her birthplace Gruszki-Guszczewina

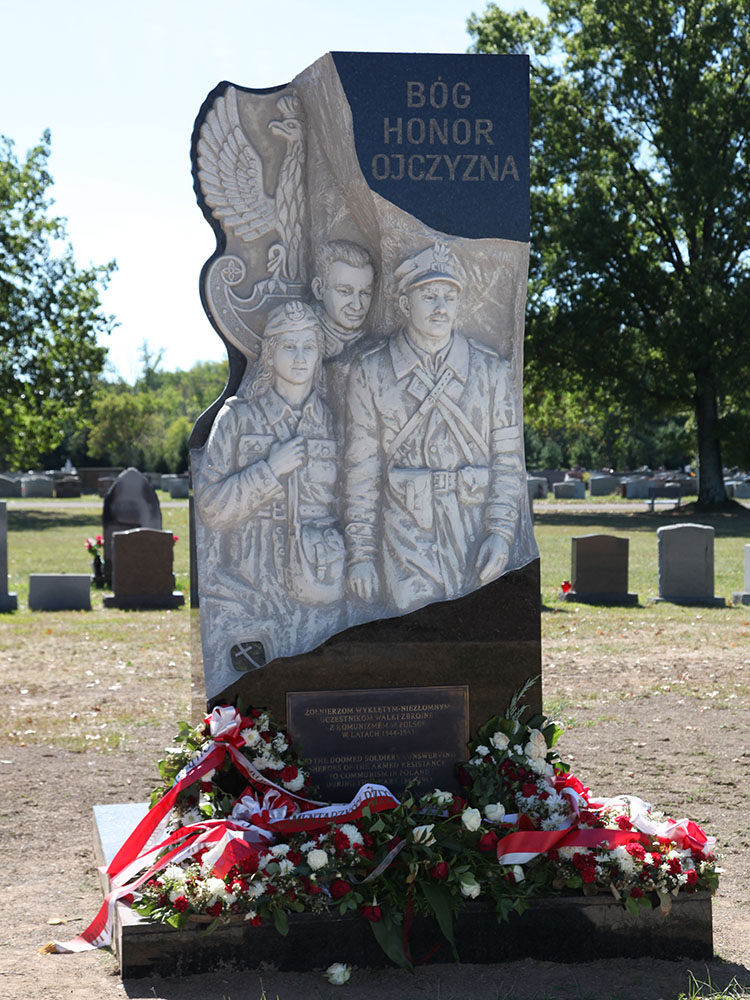
Monument to the Unbroken Soldiers in Doylestown

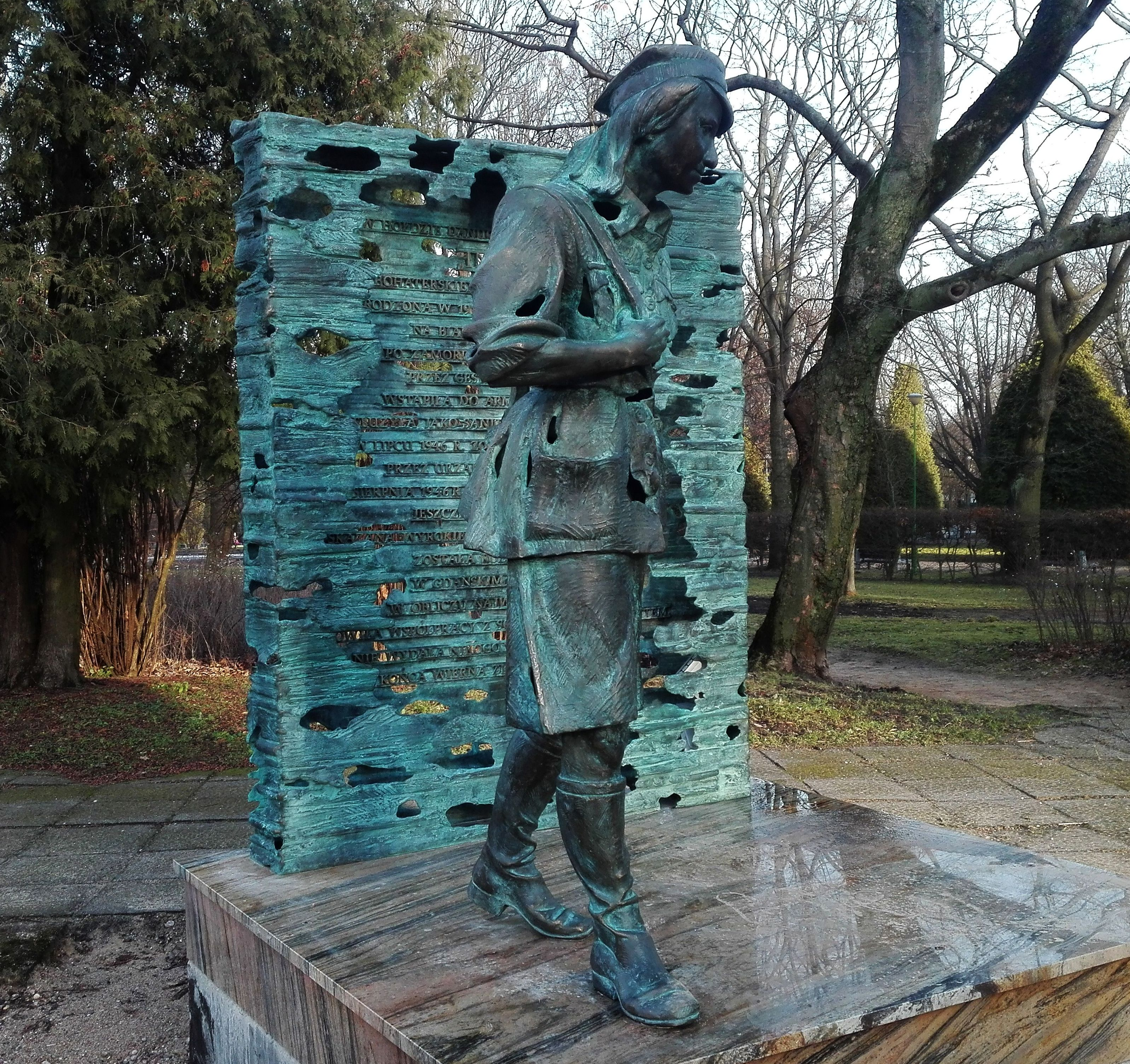
Monument to «Inka» in Białystok

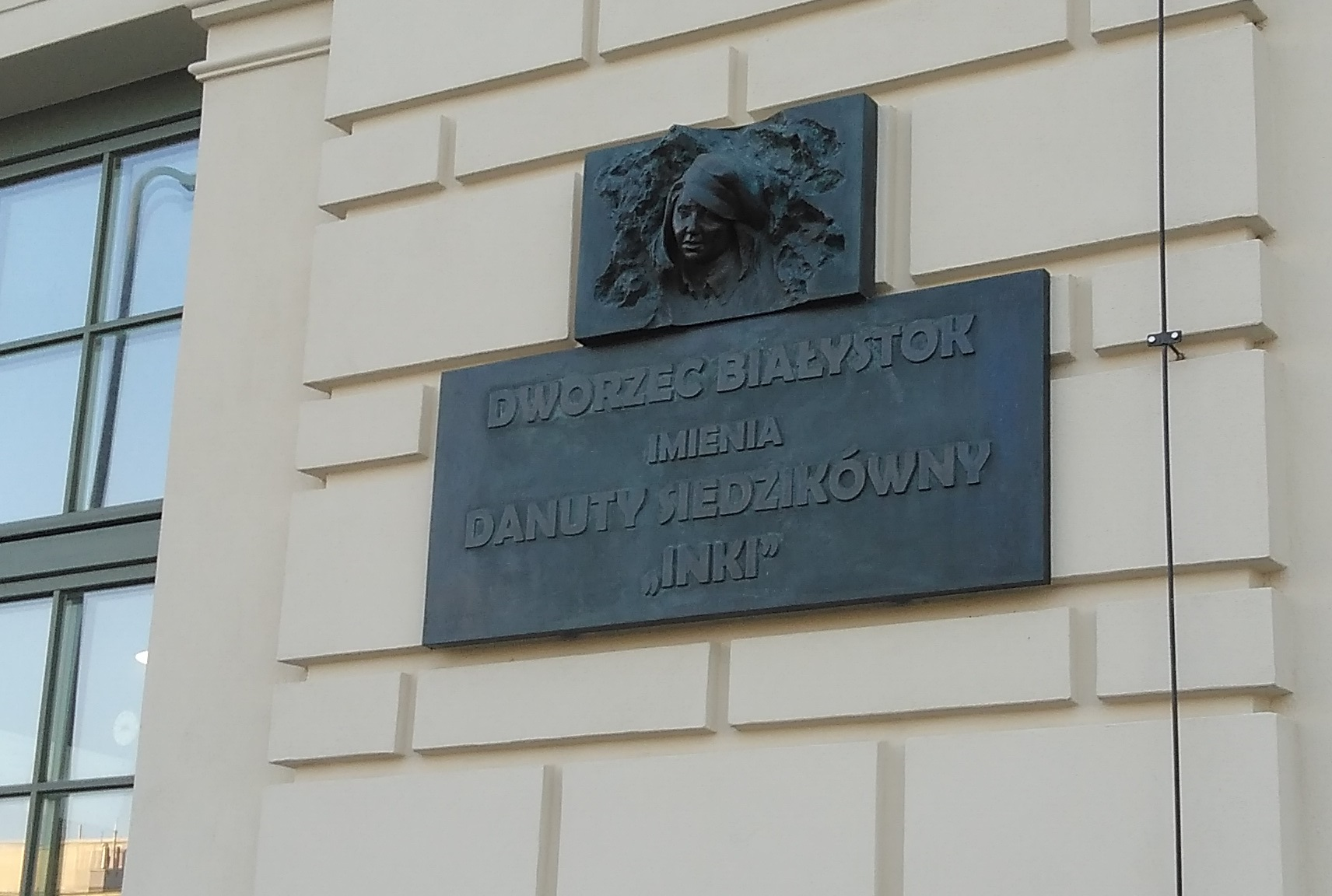
Białystok Station named after Danuta Siedzikówna "Inka" – commemorative plaque

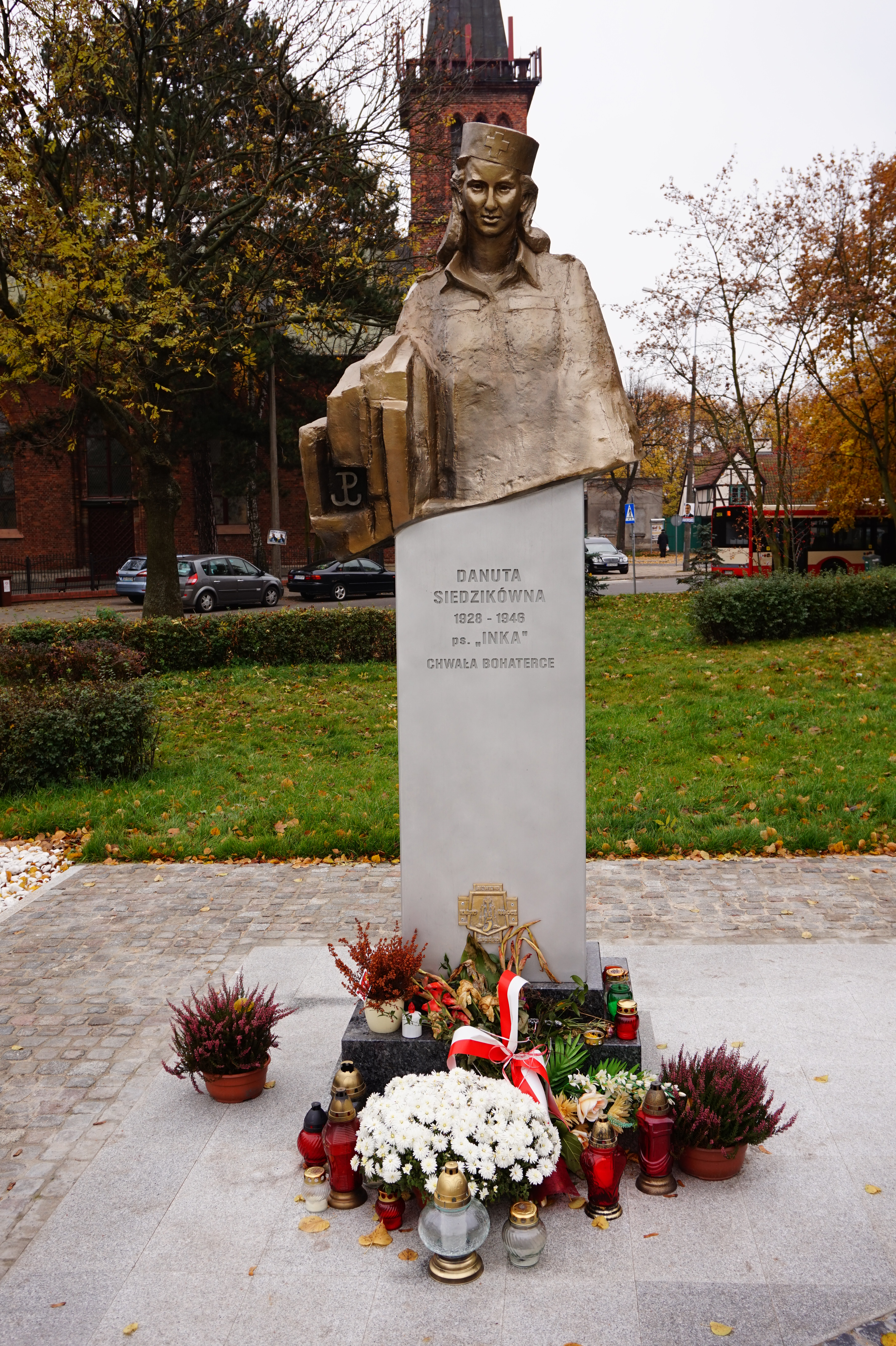
Monumento a Danuta Siedzikówna «Inka» en Gdańsk

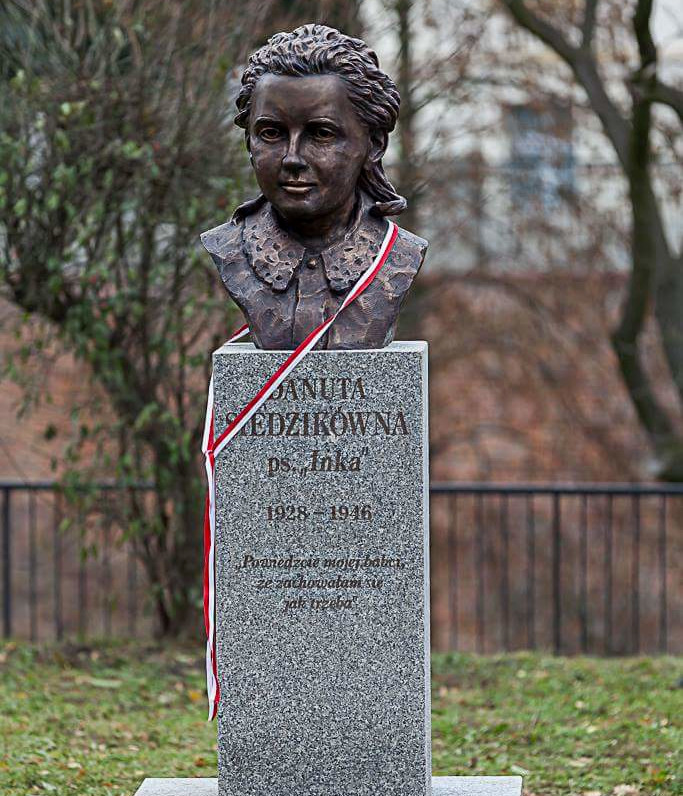
Monument of Danuta Siedzikówna in Głogów

== Private Life ==
Danuta was the granddaughter of Helena Tymińska zd. Rzepecka (20.05.1885 Tashkent Uzbekistan - 05.09.1968) and Jan Tymiński (21.09.1871 Boćki - 22.03.1940) and Aniela Siedzik zd. Kiejno (1872-1951) and Pawel Siedzik (11.11.1861 - 20.07.1912). One of the grandmothers is referred to by the well-known phrase “Tell my grandmother, that I behaved as I should”. Danuta came from a Polish family with significant historical and cultural ties. She was the sister of Wiesława Korzeń, the niece of Brunon Tymiński - the technical director of the factory in Ełk awarded the Knight’s Cross of the Order of Polonia Restituta (15.04.1924 - 21.06.2020) and the cousin of Paweł Hur and Wiesław Grzebisz (14.04.1933-09.02.2023) - the director of a factory PZL in Wrocław, awarded the Knight’s Cross of the Order of Polonia Restituta; and the great-aunt of dr. Anna Tertel, an architect, urbanist, and artist.

== See also ==
• Albina Mali

== Links ==
- Polonia Restituta Information website
- Prospect about Inka, elknet.pl; accessed 7 May 2014.
- Account of Execution given by Reverend Marian Prusak, "Inka's" Confessor, doomedsoldiers.com; accessed 7 May 2014.
