= Guszczewina =

- Village
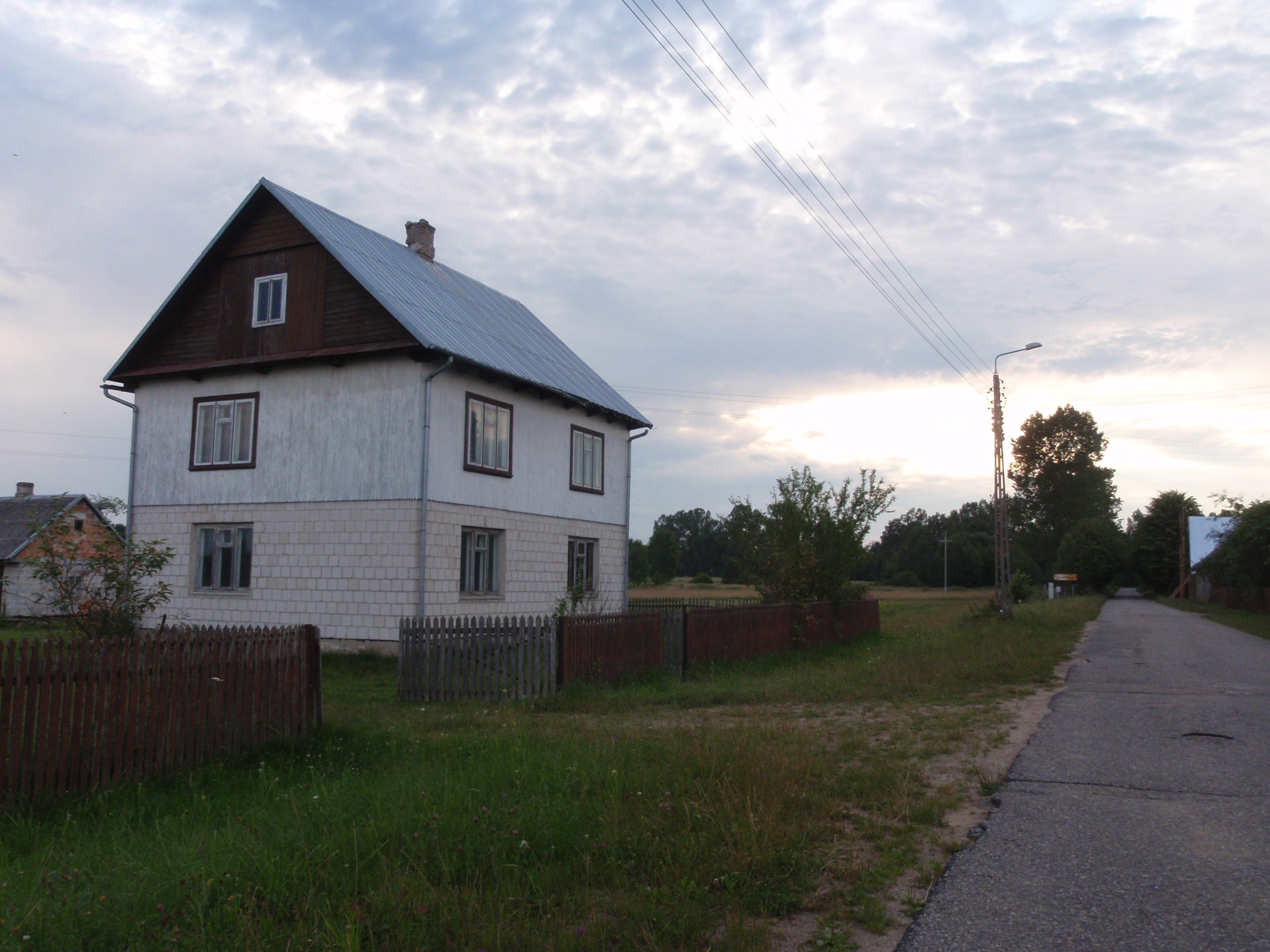

- Location within Poland
- Coordinates: 52°50′3″N 23°47′35″E
- Country: Poland
- Voivodeship: Podlaskie
- County: Hajnówka
- Gmina: Narewka
- Population: 61
- Time zone: UTC+1 (CET)
  - Summer (DST): UTC+2 (CEST)

Guszczewina [ɡuʂt͡ʂɛˈvina] is a village in the administrative district of Gmina Narewka, within Hajnówka County, Podlaskie Voivodeship, in north-eastern Poland, close to the border with Belarus.

The settlement Gruszki is considered part of the village.

During the German occupation of Poland (World War II), the German Police Battalion 322 expelled the entire population (and murdered two Polish inhabitants), and then plundered and destroyed the village (see Nazi crimes against the Polish nation). After the war the village was rebuilt.

Danuta Siedzikówna, member of the Polish resistance movement in World War II and the anti-communist resistance movement, national heroine of Poland, was born in the village. There is a memorial to Siedzikówna in Gruszki near the forestry.
