= Narewka =

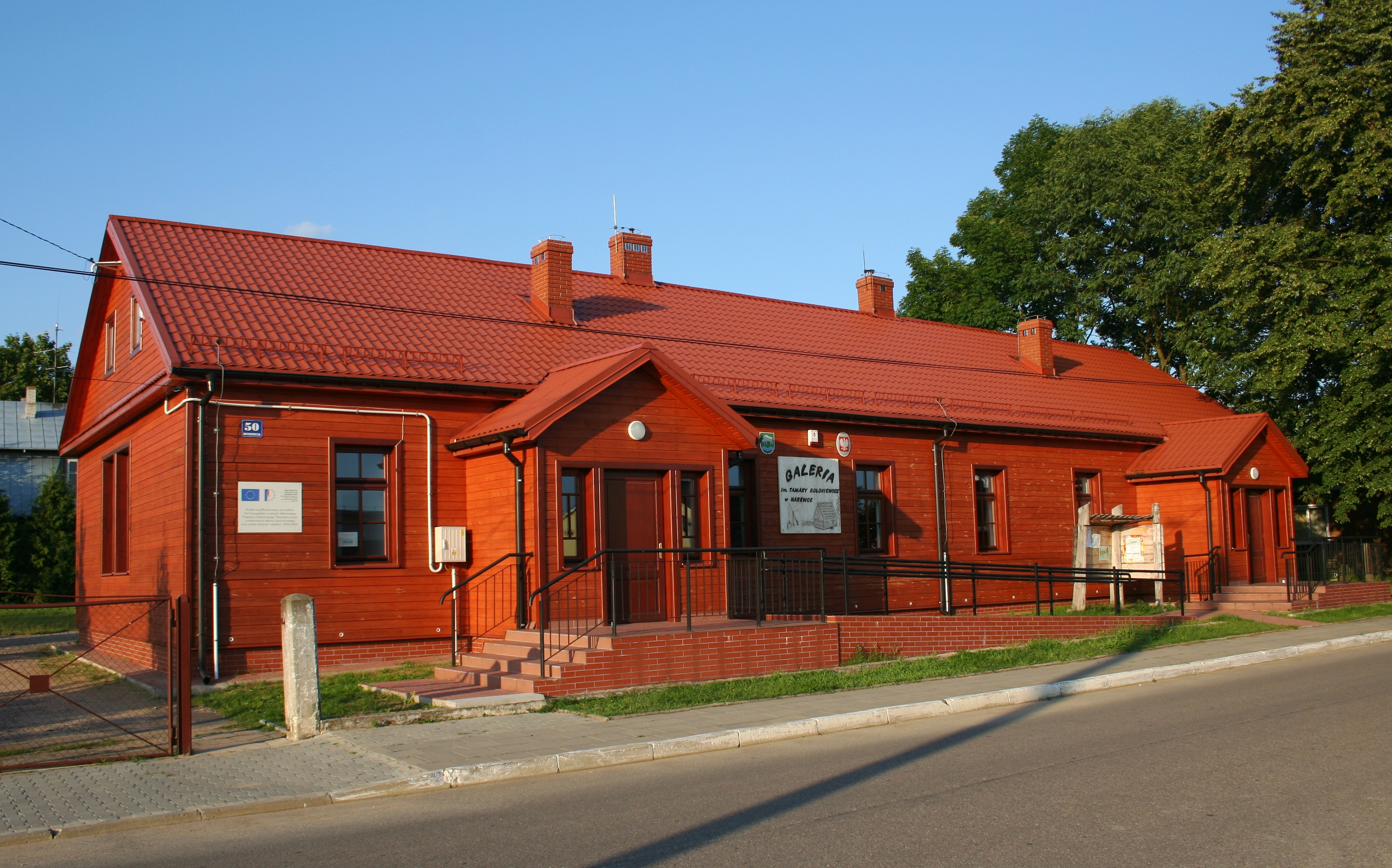
- Galeria Tamary Sołoniewicz

- Coat of arms

- Location within Poland
- Coordinates: 52°50′10″N 23°45′27″E
- Country: Poland
- Voivodeship: Podlaskie
- County: Hajnówka
- Gmina: Narewka

Population (2011)
  - Total: 935
- Time zone: UTC+1 (CET)
  - Summer (DST): UTC+2 (CEST)
- Postal code: 17-220
- Area code: +48 85
- Car plates: BHA

Narewka [naˈrɛfka] (Belarusian: На́раўка, romanized: Narawka) is a village in eastern Poland, with its population estimated at 935 residents (as of 2011). It is located in Gmina Narewka, Hajnówka County, within Podlaskie Voivodeship. The village is located near Poland's border with Belarus, and is situated on the river Narewka. Many of its residents belong to Poland's Belarusian minority.

It is in one of five Polish-Belarusian bilingual regions in Podlaskie Voivodeship regulated by the Act of 6 January 2005 on National and Ethnic Minorities and on the Regional Languages, which permits certain gminas with significant linguistic minorities to introduce a second, auxiliary language to be used in official contexts alongside Polish.

The village has Polish Catholic and Belarusian Eastern Orthodox churches. It used to have a synagogue, but it was burned down by the local Jewish population in 1940, angered after the Red Army, which had invaded Poland in 1939, desecrated the synagogue by turning it into a storage building. The vast majority of Narewka's once predominant Jewish community were murdered by the Nazis in the Holocaust in 1940. In 1921, the Jewish population of the village was 758. In 2018, almost 80 years after the burning of the synagogue, a plaque was placed at the site in memory of Narewka's Jewish community. This came about as a collaboration between a local Polish high school and one in Israel.

Narewka, due to its position near the Belarus–Poland border, has been a site of movement of migrants during the Belarus–European Union border crisis that began in 2021. A site in the woods near the village has served as a meeting point with drivers who hope to be able to drive migrants to other European Union countries. There is no actual border crossing in the area, but it continued to be a node for refugees during the Ukrainian refugee crisis that began in 2022 as a result of the Russian invasion of Ukraine.

== Notable people ==
- Leon Leyson (1929–2013), Polish-American Holocaust survivor
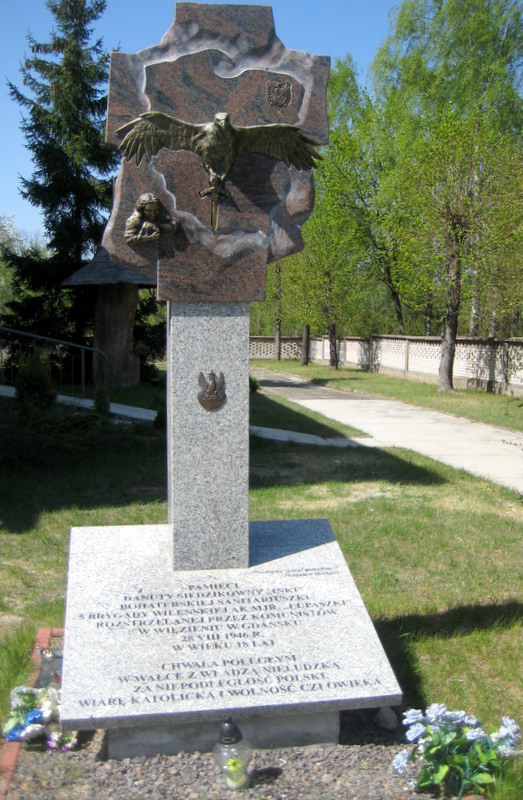
Memorial for Danuta Siedzikówna

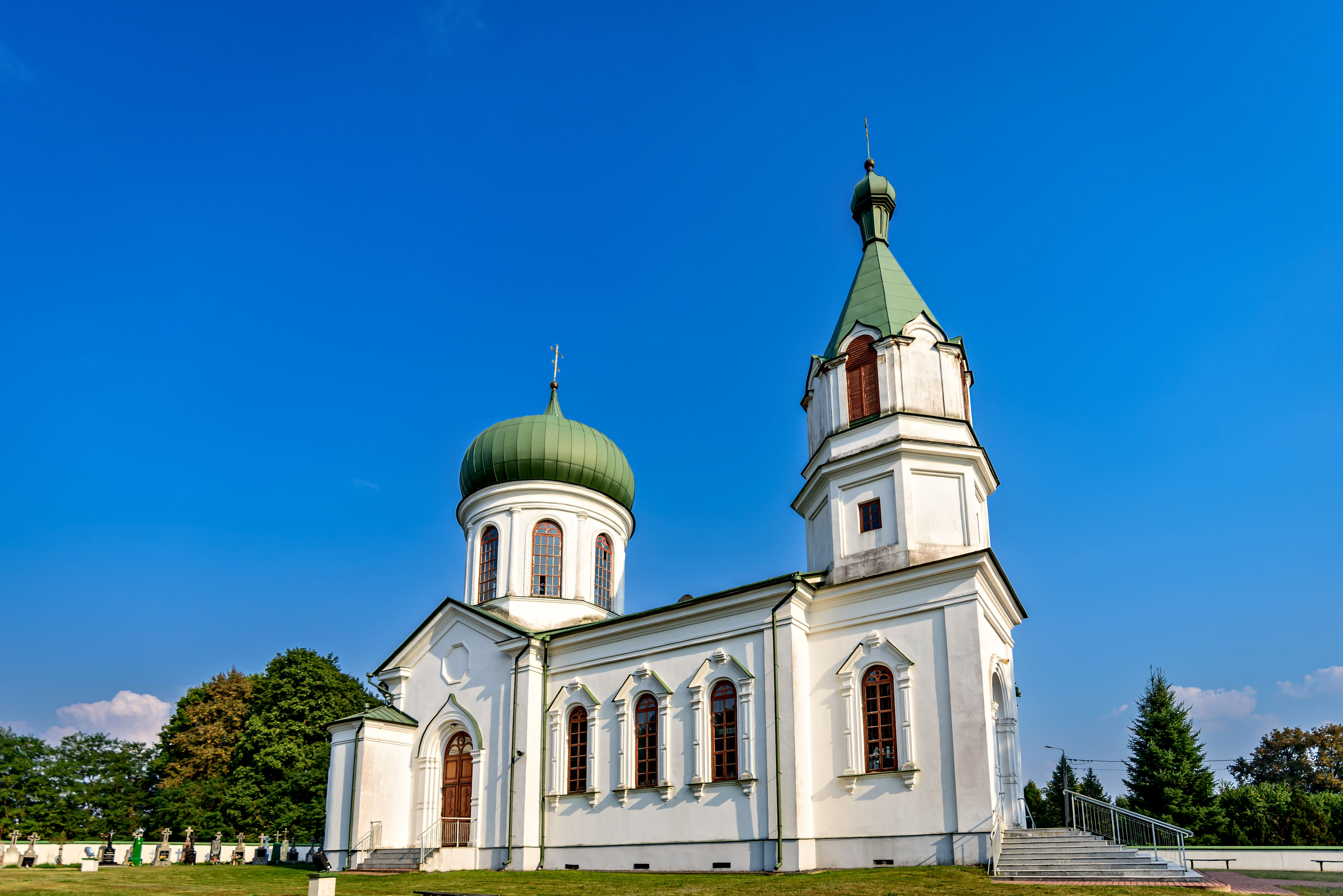
Belarusian Orthodox Church

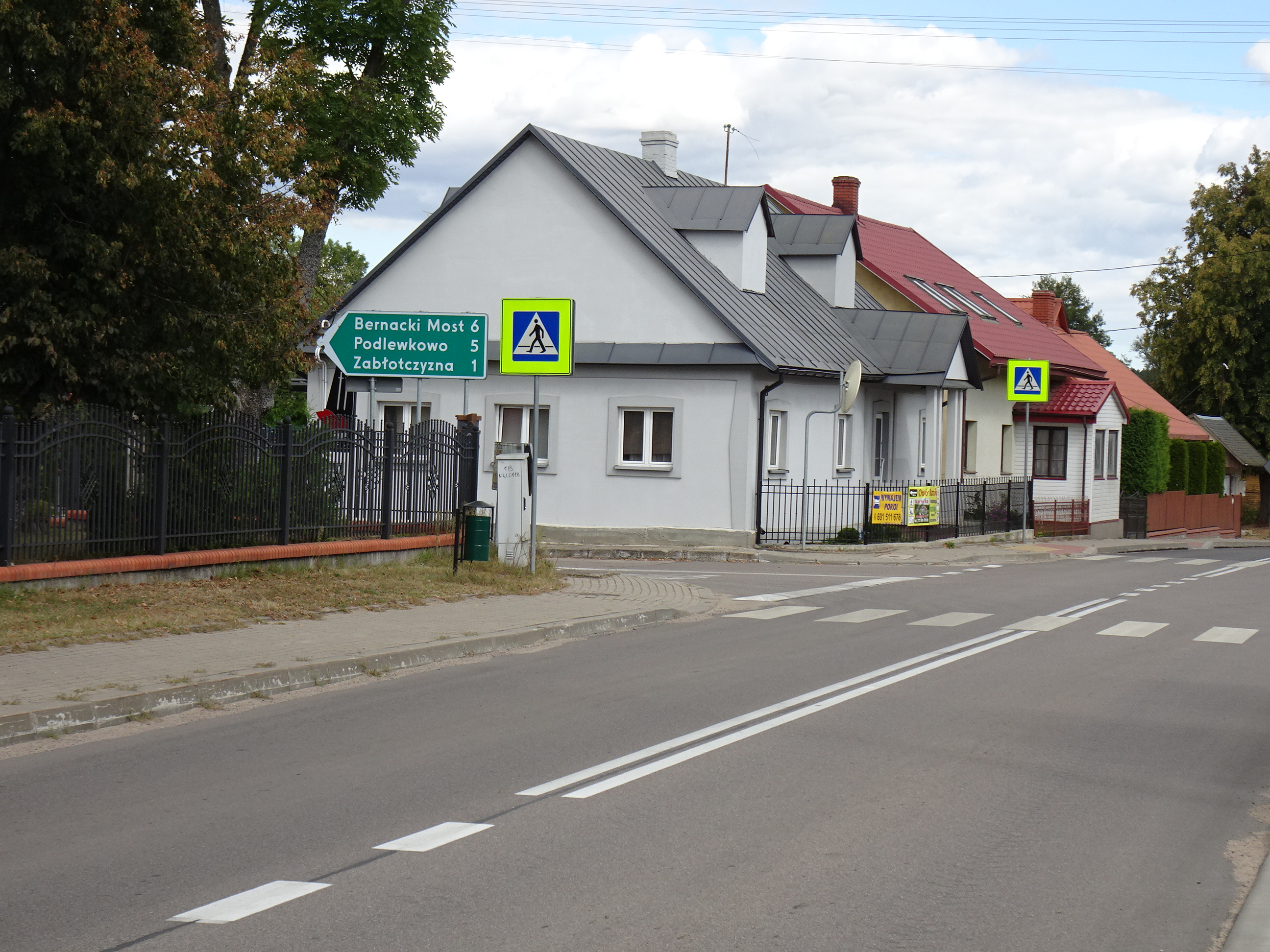
Entry into the village

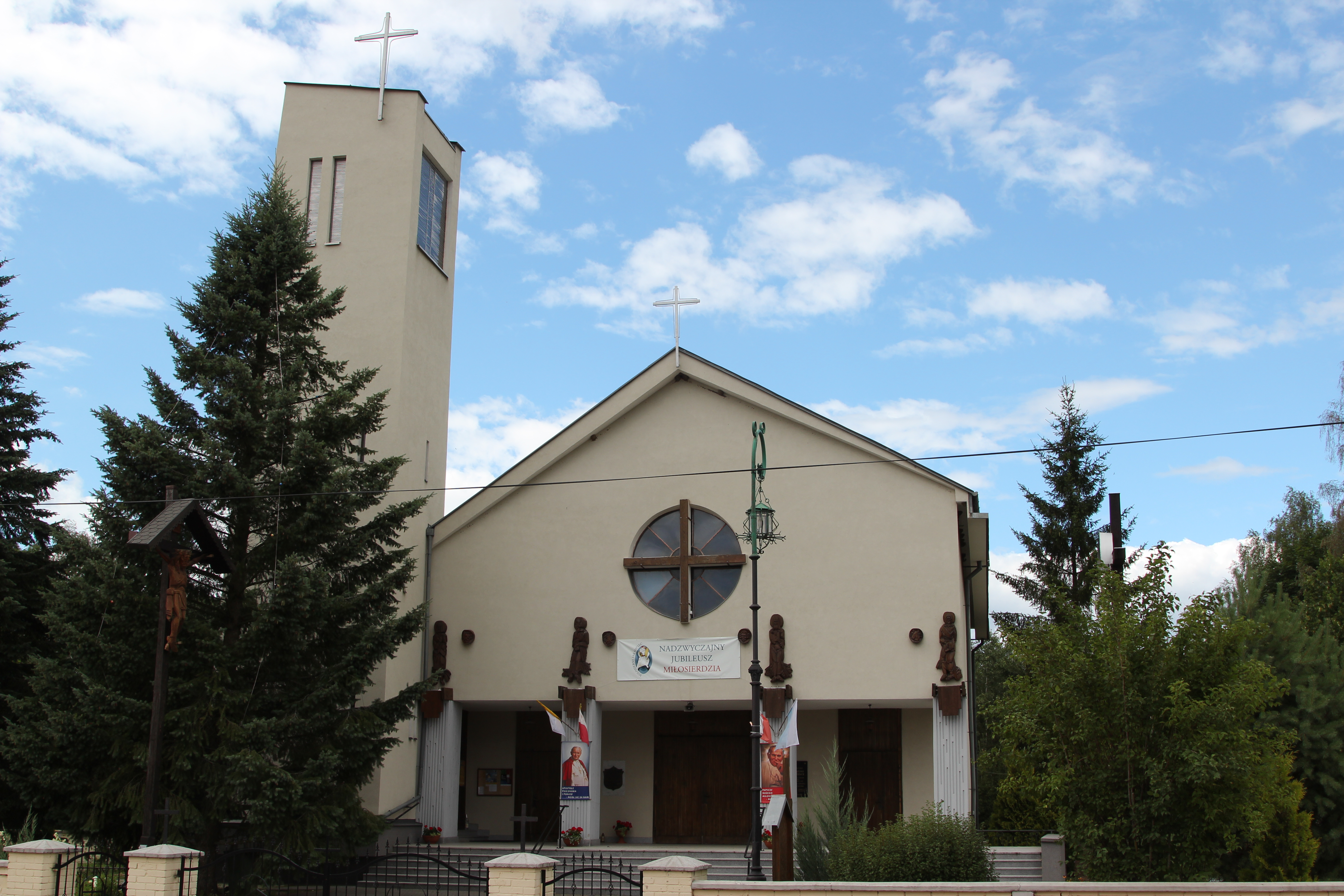
St. John's Catholic Church

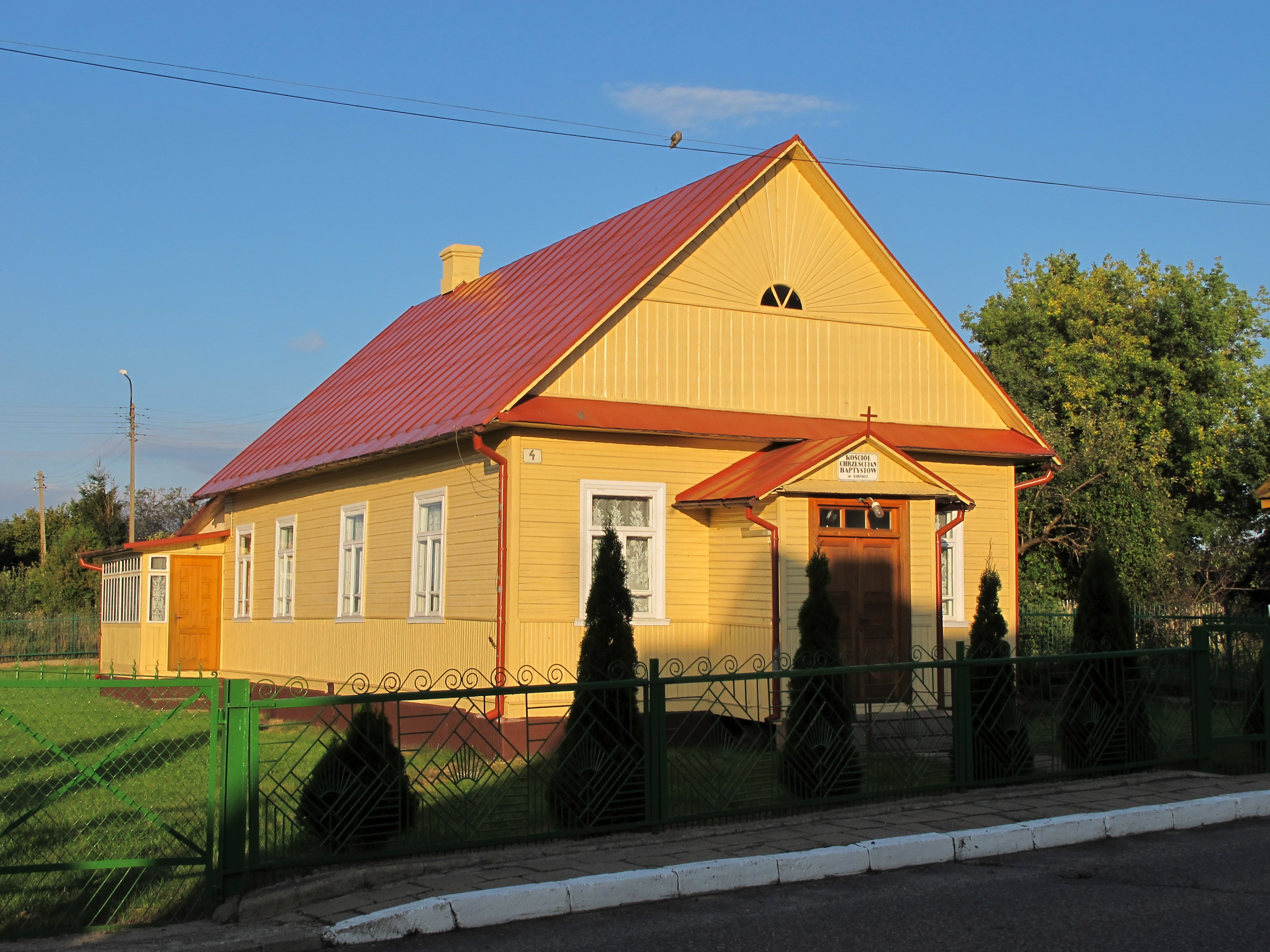
Baptist Church

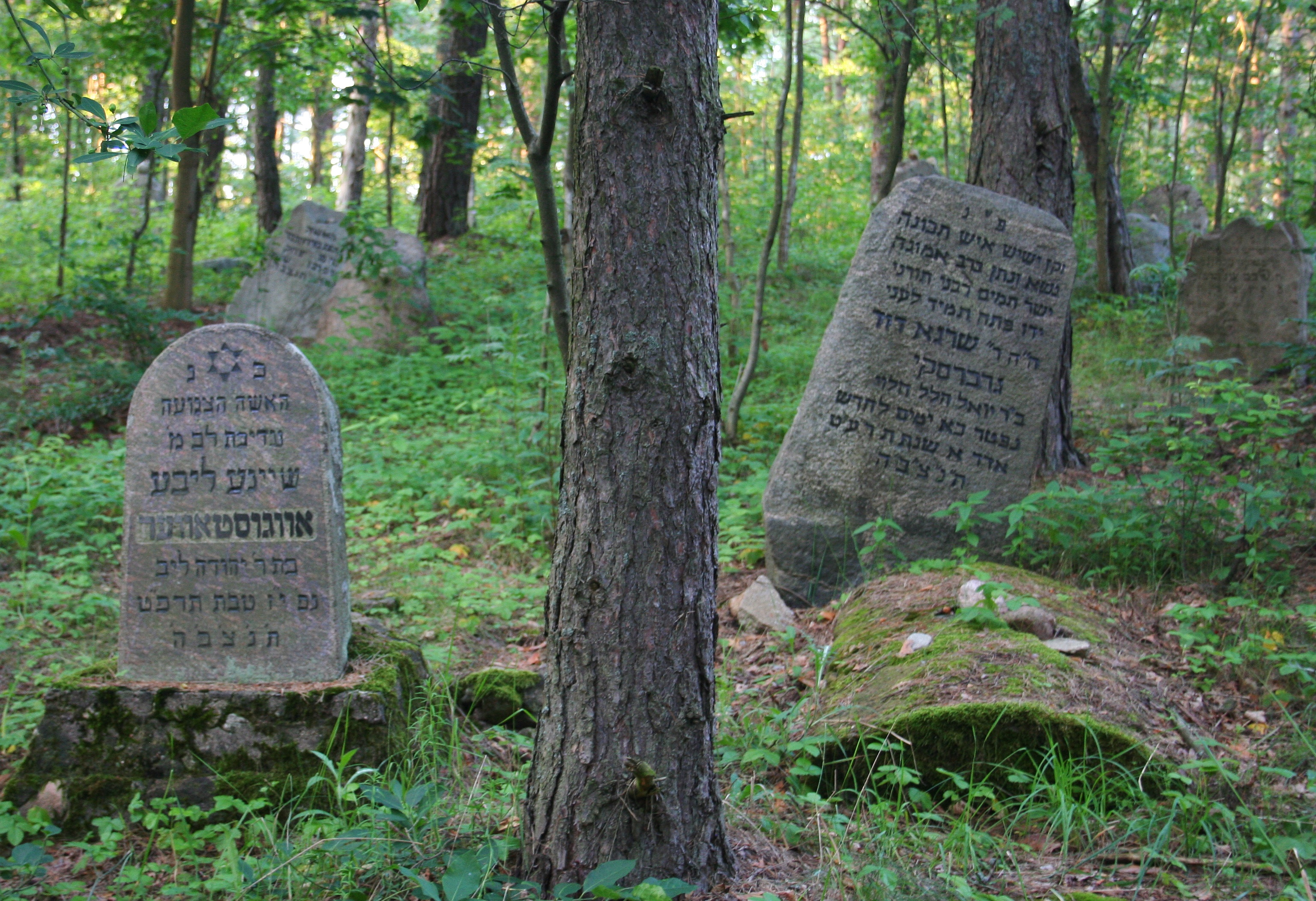
The Jewish Cemetery
