= Krzywokonna =

Village in the Zelva District, Belarus

Krzywokonna Крываконна / Кривоконно
- Village
- Interactive map of Krzywokonna
- Coordinates: 53°09′55.8″N 24°43′39.0″E
- Country: Belarus
- Region: Grodno Region
- District: Zelva District
- Selsoviet: Zelva Selsoviet

Population (2009)
  - Total: 85
- Time zone: FET

Krzywokonna (Крываконна, Кривоконно) is a village in Zelva District, Grodno Region, in western Belarus. It is administered as part of the Zelva Selsoviet.

As of the 2009 census, the village had a population of 85.

== History ==
During the interwar period, Krzywokonno was part of Poland, in Białystok Voivodeship, Wołkowysk County, and the Zelwa municipality. On 16 October 1933, it became the seat of the village administrative unit (gromada) of Krzywokonno. After World War II, the village became part of the Soviet Union.
