= Harasimowicze =

- Village
- Location within Poland
- Coordinates: 53°39′38″N 23°25′20″E
- Country: Poland
- Voivodeship: Podlaskie
- County: Sokółka
- Gmina: Dąbrowa Białostocka

Area
  - Total: 7.54 km^{2} (2.91 sq mi)

Population (2021)
  - Total: 194
  - Density: 25.73/km^{2} (66.6/sq mi)
- Time zone: UTC+1 (CET)
  - Summer (DST): UTC+2 (CEST)
- Postal code: 16-200
- Area code: +48 85
- Car plates: BSK
- SIMC: 0026502

Harasimowicze [xaraɕimɔˈvit͡ʂɛ] is a village in northeast Poland in the gmina of Gmina Dąbrowa Białostocka, Sokółka County, Podlaskie Voivodeship. As of 2021, it had a population of 194.

== Population ==
Historical population
Year	Pop.	±% p.a.
1988	277	—
2002	260	−0.45%
2011	235	−1.12%
2021	194	−1.90%
Source: GUS
