= Brańsk =

Town in Poland

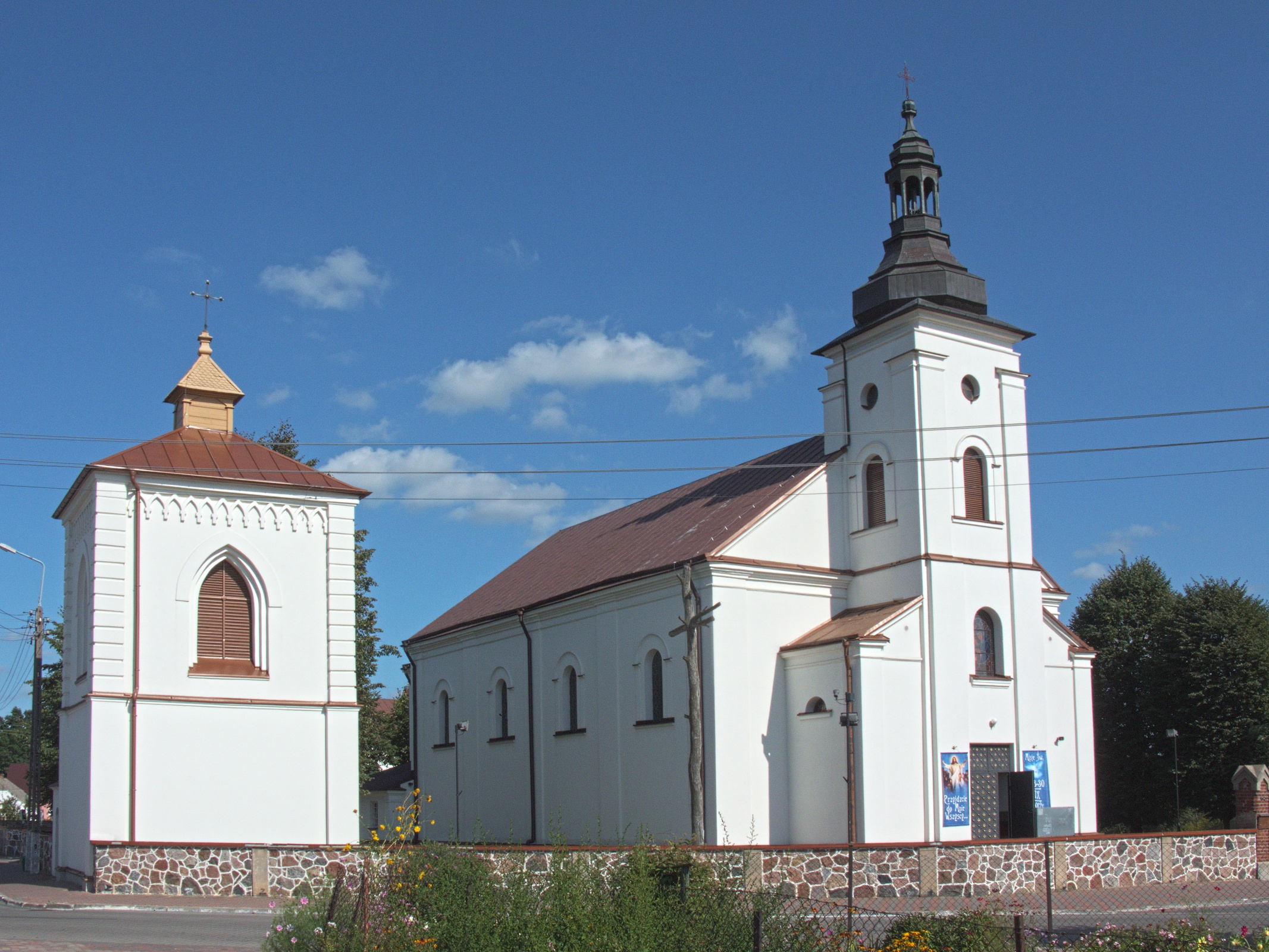
- Church of the Assumption of Mary in Brańsk

- Coat of arms

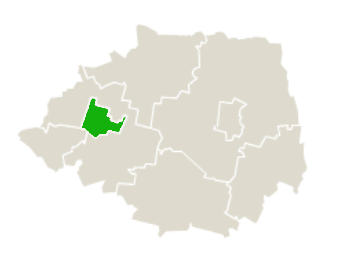

- Location within Poland
- Coordinates: 52°45′N 22°50′E
- Country: Poland
- Voivodeship: Podlaskie
- County: Bielsk
- Gmina: Brańsk (urban gmina)
- Town rights: 18 January 1493

Government
  - Mayor: Eugeniusz Tomasz Koczewski

Area
  - Total: 32.43 km^{2} (12.52 sq mi)

Population (30 June 2021)
  - Total: 3,667
  - Density: 113.1/km^{2} (292.9/sq mi)
- Time zone: UTC+1 (CET)
  - Summer (DST): UTC+2 (CEST)
- Postal code: 17-120
- Area code: +48 085
- Car plates: BBI
- Website: http://www.bransk.podlaskie.pl

Brańsk [braɲsk] (Note: Podlachian language: Бранськ, Branśk, Belarusian: Бранск) is a town in eastern Poland. It is situated within the Bielsk County in the Podlaskie Voivodeship (province).

== Etymology ==
The name of the town comes from the river Bronka, a nearby tributary of the Nurzec River.

== Geography ==
=== Location ===
Brańsk is located in the geographical region of Europe known as the Wysoczyzny Podlasko–Białoruskie (English: Podlaskie and Belarus Plateau) and the mesoregion known as the Bielsk Plain (Polish: Równina Bielska). The Nurzec River, a tributary of the Bug River, passes through Brańsk. The town covers an area of 32.43 square kilometres (12.5 sq mi).

It is located approximately:

- 140 kilometres (87.0 mi) northeast of Warsaw, the capital of Poland
- 69 kilometres (42.9 mi) southwest of Białystok, the capital of the Podlaskie Voivodeship
- 25 kilometres (15.5 mi) west of Bielsk Podlaski, the seat of Bielsk County

=== Climate ===
The region has a continental climate characterized by high temperatures during summer and long and frosty winters. The average annual rainfall exceeds 550 millimetres (21.7 in).

== History ==
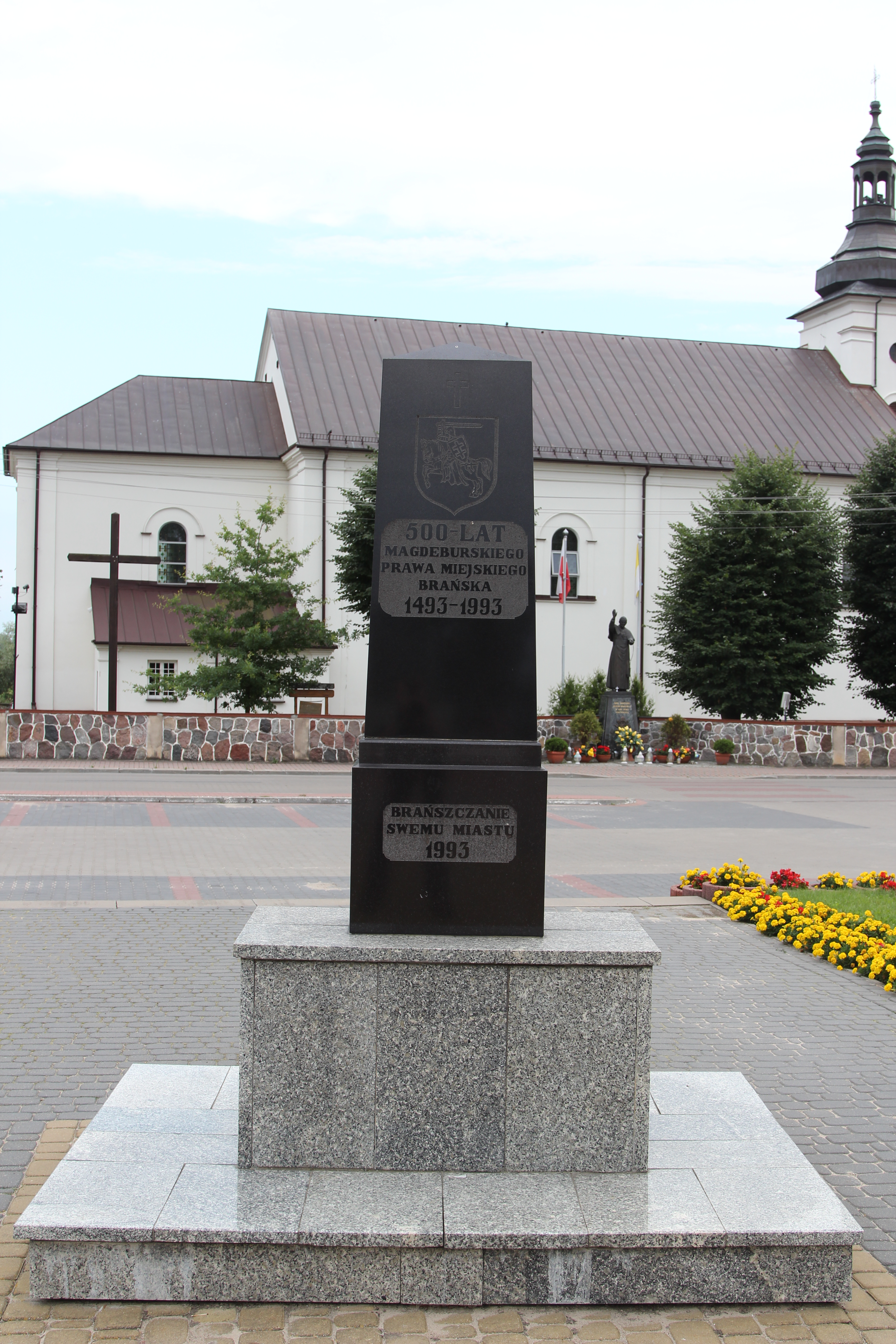
Monument commemorating the 500th anniversary of receiving town rights

On 23–25 June 1264 the Battle of Brańsk was fought in the town's vicinity. Polish forced led by Duke Boleslaw V the Chaste defeated the forces of Yotvingia led by Komata (Kumata).

On 18 January 1493, Brańsk received a town charter based on Magdeburg rights from the Grand Duke of Lithuania, Alexander Jagiellon. It was the first town in Podlachia to receive such a charter.

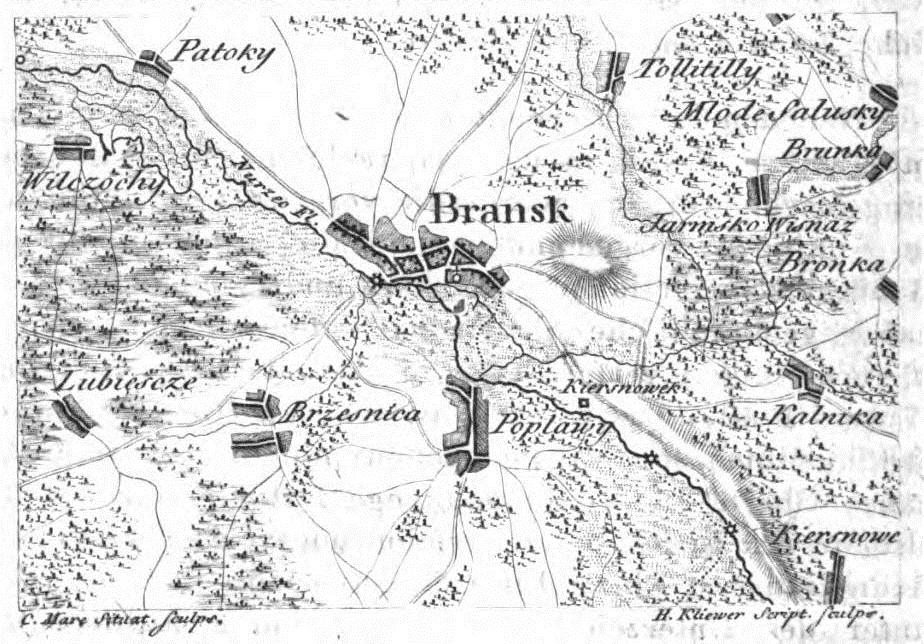
Brańsk on a map from 1804

Brańsk was a royal town of Poland, administratively located in the Bielsk County in the Podlaskie Voivodeship in the Lesser Poland Province. The 3rd Polish National Cavalry Brigade was stationed in Brańsk before the Third Partition of Poland. In 1795, as a result of the Third Partition of Poland, Brańsk was annexed to the Kingdom of Prussia and administered as a part of the newly formed Białystok Department. In 1807, as a result of the Treaties of Tilsit, Brańsk was annexed to the Russian Empire and administered at first as a part of Belostok Oblast and from 1842 on as a part of Grodno Governorate. The town was reintegrated with Poland, after the country regained independence following World War I in 1918.

=== World War II ===
On 1 September 1939 Germany attacked Poland and started World War II. Within days of the war's beginning, Brańsk suffered German bombardment. On 17 September 1939 the Soviet Union attacked Poland from the east, and in partnership with Nazi Germany, partitioned Poland under the terms of the Nazi-Soviet Non-Aggression Pact of August 23. Brańsk along with all areas of Poland east of the Bug River was then occupied by the Soviet Union. All Polish and Jewish businesses of substance were confiscated by the Communist State. Several Poles from Brańsk were murdered by the Russians in the large Katyn massacre in 1940. The Soviets remained in control of Brańsk until June 1941 when the Germans invaded their erstwhile Soviet allies.

The German Army occupied the town and ordered the Jewish community to build a ghetto surrounded by barbed wire, to which the Jewish population (some 65% of the town) was confined. On 8 November 1942 the Jews of Brańsk were ordered to report to the town center, forced to march to the nearby town of Bielsk, and then transported by train to Treblinka. Within weeks, the vast majority were murdered by gassing at the Treblinka extermination camp. Several local Jews were hidden and rescued by Poles (including the local parish priest) in Brańsk and nearby villages. Some hiding places in nearby villages were discovered by the Germans, who then murdered captured Jews. Their Polish rescuers were either also murdered or managed to hide from the Germans until the end of the German occupation.

On 1 August 1944 the town was captured by Soviet forces. On 4 August 1944 the Russians arrested 12 officers of the Polish underground Home Army in Brańsk, after they were deceitfully gathered for a supposed formal meeting with the command of the Soviet 65th Army. The town was soon restored to Poland, although with a Soviet-installed communist regime, which remained in power until the Fall of Communism in the end of the 1980s.

The Polish anti-communist resistance was active in Brańsk, and in 1945–1947, it carried out four raids on the local communist police station.

In 1996, a PBS Frontline documentary titled Shtetl was released that documented the history of Brańsk's Jewish population before, during, and after Holocaust.

== Demographics ==
Historical population
Year	Pop.	±%
1921	3,739	—
1931	4,204	+12.4%
1939	4,611	+9.7%
1950	2,553	−44.6%
1960	2,951	+15.6%
2010	3,751	+27.1%

=== Population ===
According to the 1921 census, the town was inhabited by 3,739 people, among whom 1,474 were Roman Catholic, 100 Orthodox, and 2,165 Jewish. At the same time, 1,530 inhabitants declared Polish nationality, 2,165 Jewish, 32 Belarusian and 12 Russian. There were 493 residential buildings in the village.

Detailed data as of 30 June 2021:

	Total		Women		Men	
Unit	Number	%	Number	%	Number	%
Population	3,667	100	1,808	49.3	1,859	50.7
Population Density (persons/km^{2})	113.1		55.8		57.3	

== Municipal government ==
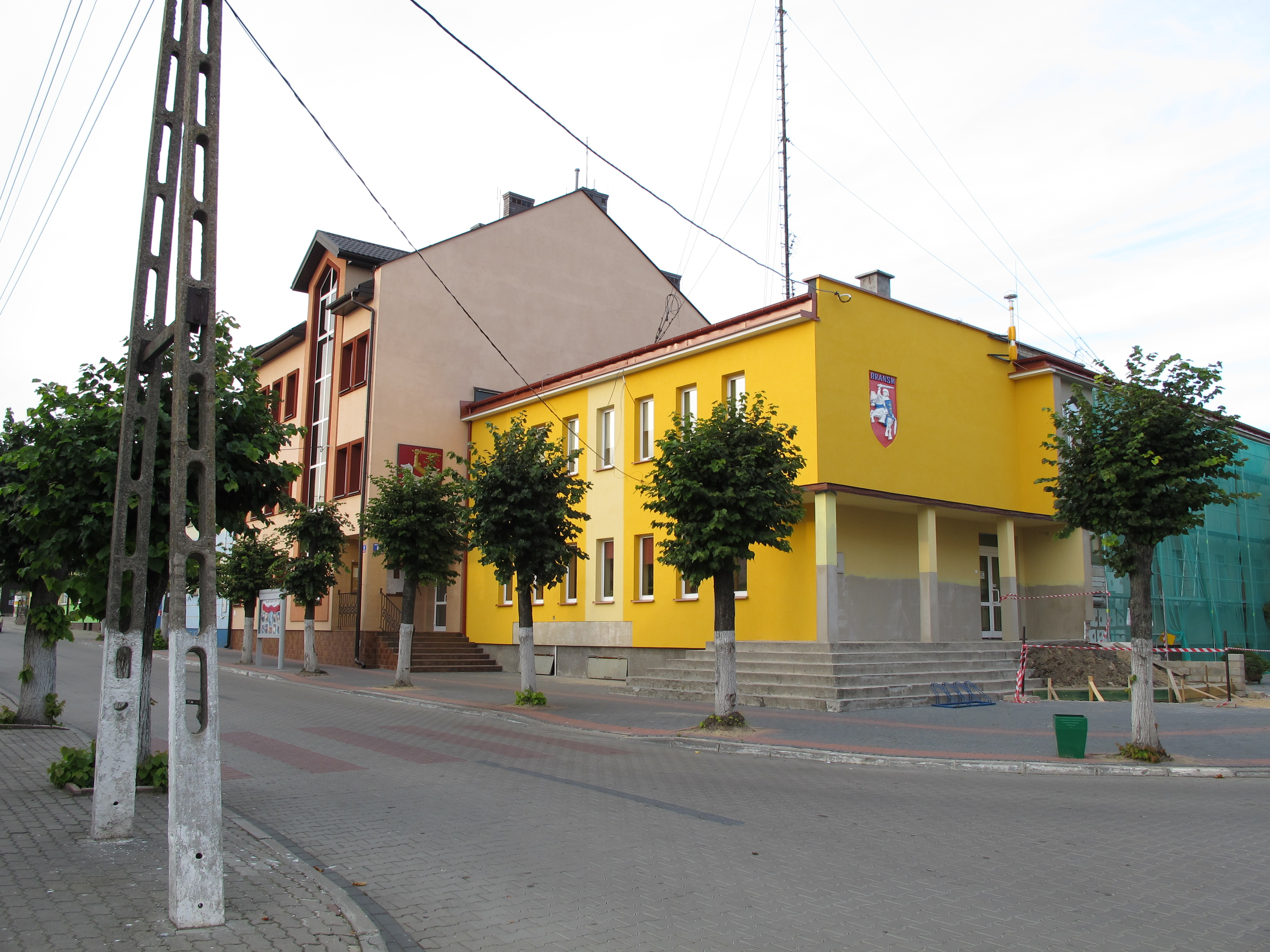
The municipal building in Brańsk

It is the seat of Gmina Brańsk, but is not part of Gmina Brańsk.

=== Executive branch ===
The chief executive of the government is the Mayor (Polish: Burmistrz).

=== Legislative branch ===
The legislative portion of the government is the Council (Polish: Rada) composed of the President (Polish: Przewodniczšcy), the Vice President (Polish: Wiceprzewodniczšcy) and thirteen councilors.

=== Neighbouring political subdivisions ===
Brańsk is bordered by Gminy Rudka and Brańsk.

== Transport ==
=== Roads and highways ===
Brańsk is at the intersection of a National Road and a Voivodeship Road:

- National Road DK 66 - Zambrów - Brańsk - Bielsk Podlaski - Kleszczele - Czeremcha - Połowce Border Crossing (Belarus)
- Voivodeship Road DW 681 - Roszki-Wodźki - Łapy - Brańsk - Ciechanowiec

==== Streets ====
The major streets (Polish: Ulica) in Brańsk are:

- Rynek
- Armii Krajowej (National Road DK 66)
- Bielska
- Binduga
- Boćkowska
- Błonie
- Jagiellońska
- Jana Pawła II (Voivodeship Road DW 681)
- Kapicy Milewskiego
- Kasztanowa
- Klonowa
- Konopnickiej
- Kościelna
- Kościuszki (Voivodeship Road DW 681)
- Mickiewicza
- Piłsudskiego
- Poniatowskiego
- Senatorska
- Sienkiewicza
- Skłodowskiej-Curie
- Szkolna
- Słowackiego
- Witosa
- Wyszyńskiego
- Ściegiennego

=== Public transport ===
==== Bus service ====
Regular bus service is provided by Państwowa Komunikacja Samochodowa (State Car Communication, PKS) via PKS Bielsk Podlaskie, PKS Białystok and PKS Siemiatycze

==== Rail service ====
The closest passenger train service is provided by Polskie Koleje Państwowe (Polish State Railways, PKP) SA from the following stations:

- Szepietowo - express and local service to Warsaw and Białystok - 28 kilometres (17.4 mi) northwest
- Bielsk Podlaski - express and local service to Siedlce and Białystok - 25 kilometres (15.5 mi) east

== Economy ==
The land-use is as follows:

- Agricultural use: 66%
- Forest land: 27%
- City: 2.34%

=== Major business ===
- Financial:Banking - Bank Spóldzielczy w Brańsku, ul. Kosciuszki 2A, 17-120 Brańsk, Poland
- Manufacturing:Plastics - Wald-Gold, ul. M. Konopnickiej 20, 17-120 Brańsk, Poland

== Local attractions ==
=== Places of worship ===
Churches, chapels and shrines in Brańsk (examples)

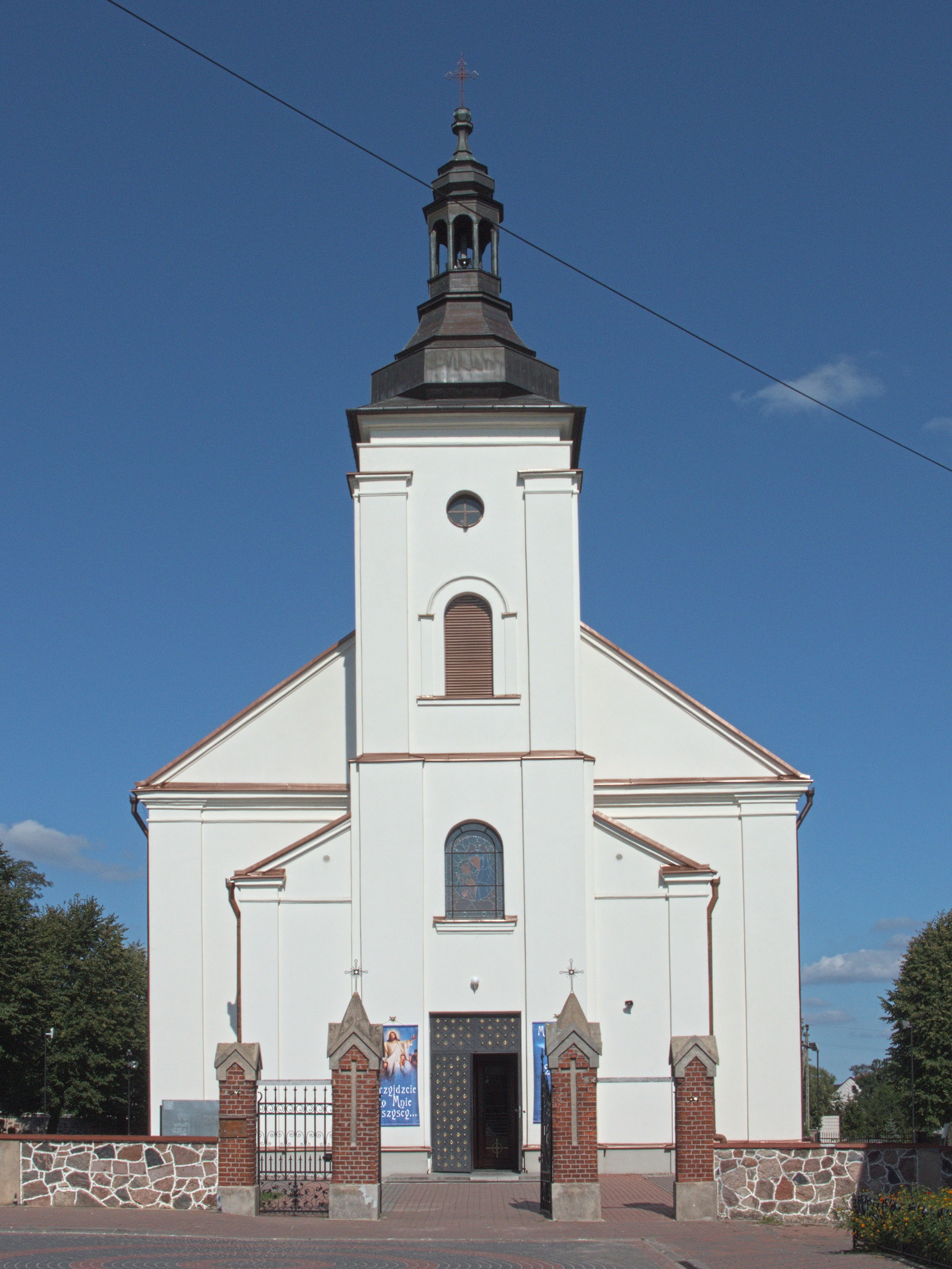
Church of the Assumption

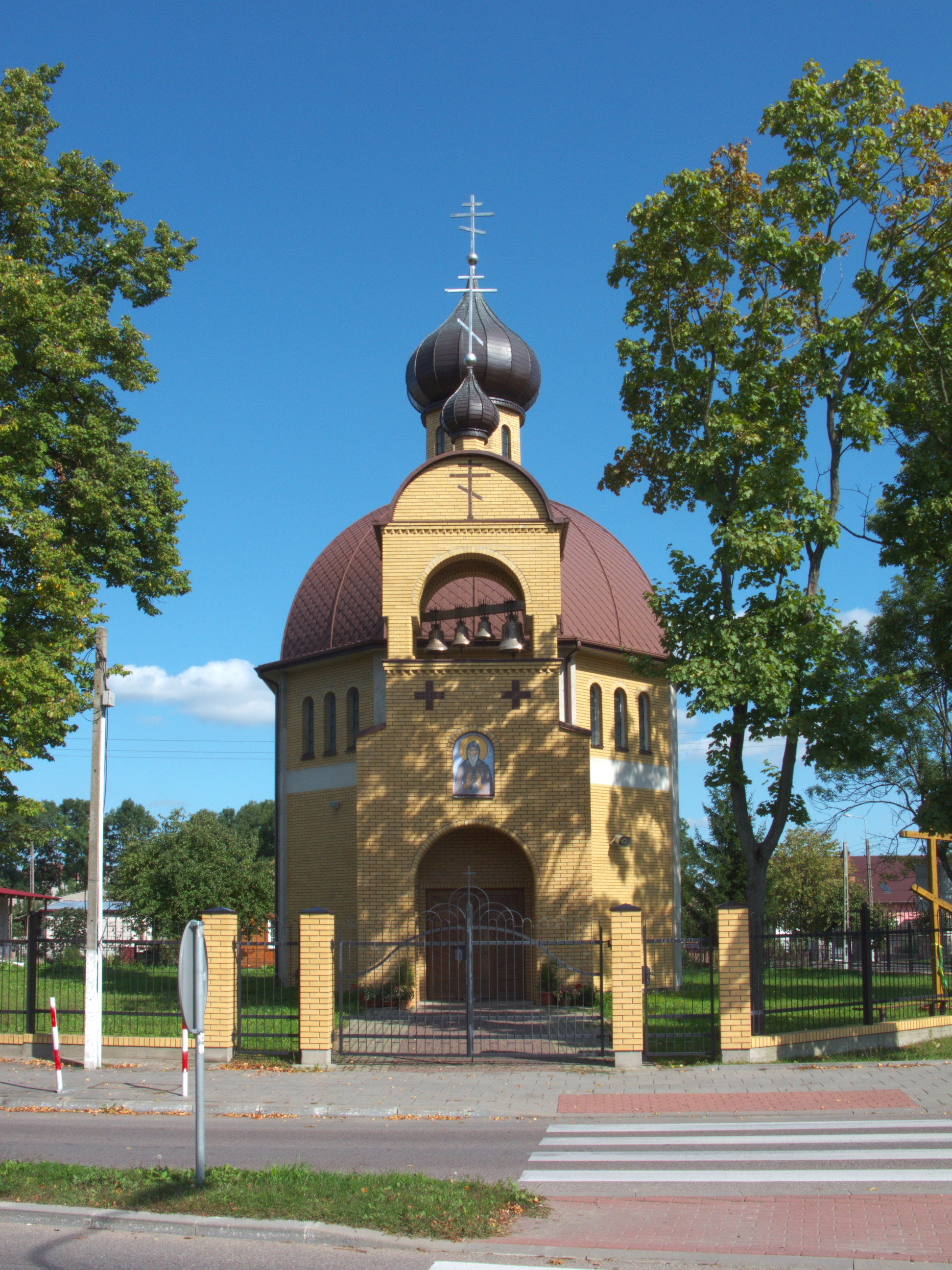
Saint Simeon church

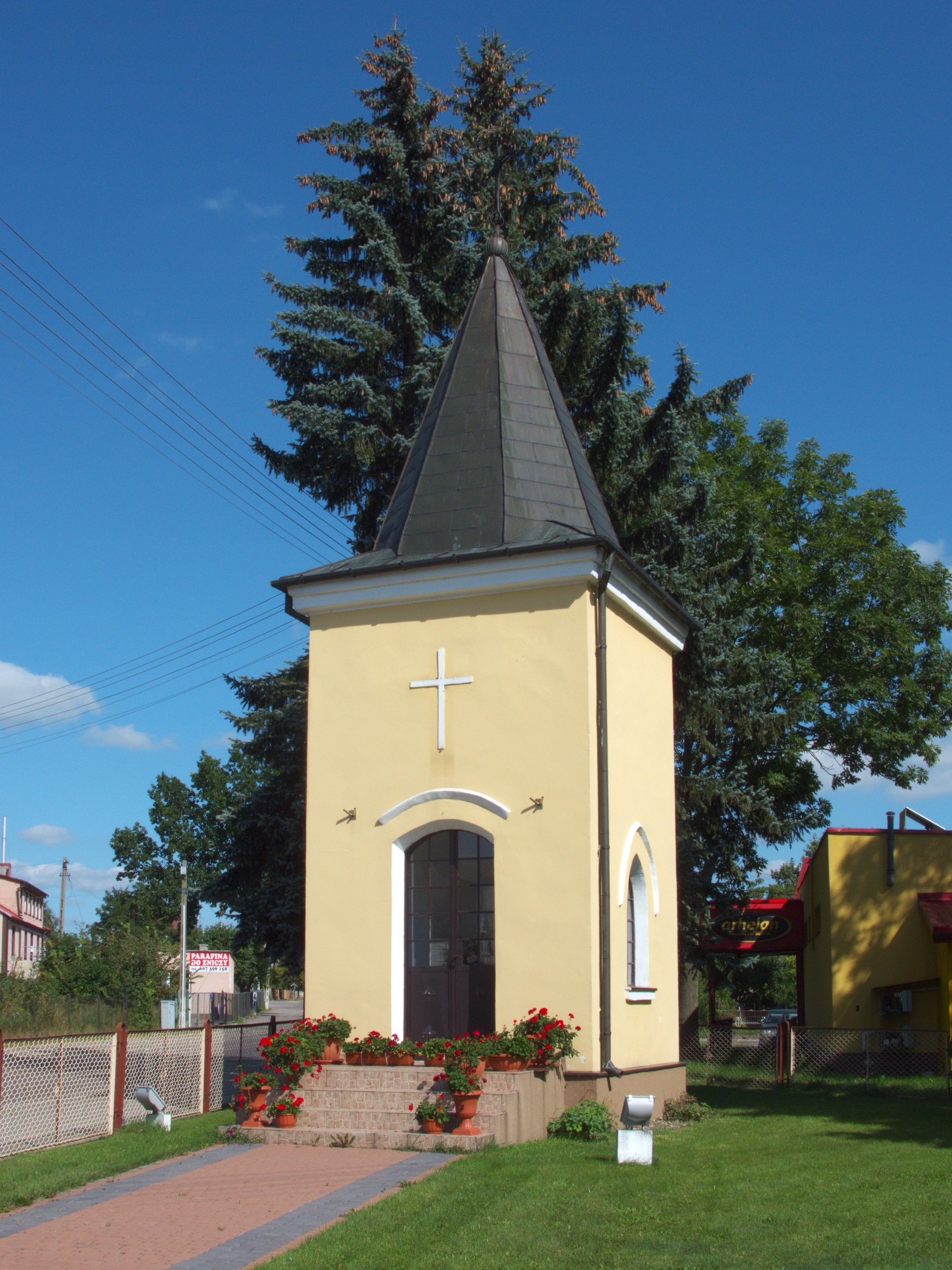
Blessed Virgin Mary shrine

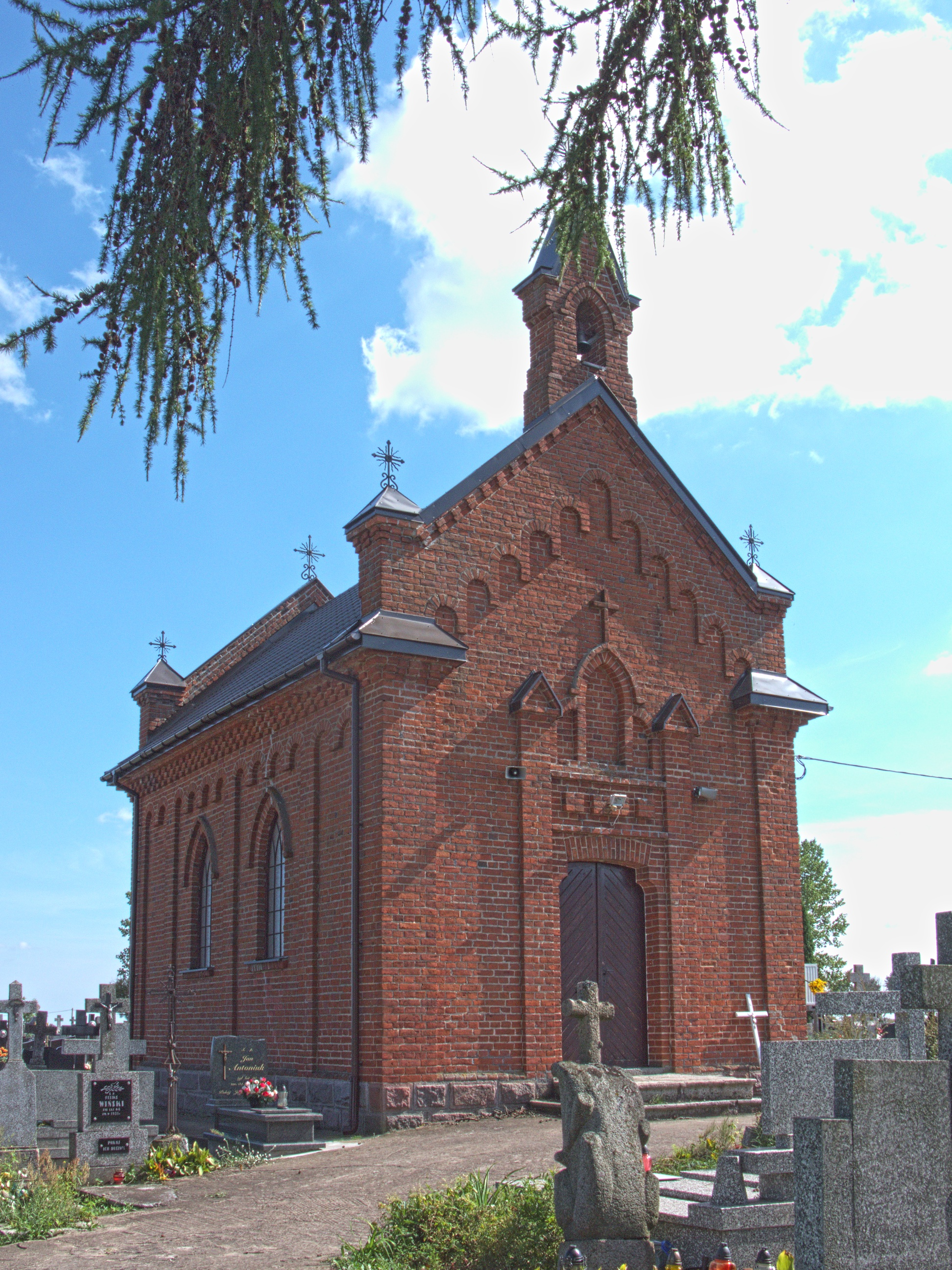
Saint Scholastica cemetery chapel

- Church of the Assumption of the Blessed Virgin Mary - Roman Catholic. The parish is serving Brańsk, Bronka, Brzeźnica, Glinnik, Jarmarkowszczyzna, Kalnica, Kiersnówek, Majerowizna, Oleksin, Otapy, Patoki, Popławy, Świrydy, Załuskie Koronne, Załuskie Kościelne. It is part of the Roman Catholic Diocese of Drohiczyn.
- St. Simeon Stylites - Polish Orthodox. It is a mission church of the Church of the Apostles St. Peter and Paul in Malesze, part of the Polish Orthodox Diocese of Warsaw-Bielsk.

== Nearby attractions ==
- Our Lady of Hodyszewo Sanctuary (Sanktuarium Matki Bożej Pojedniania) in Hodyzewo - 12 kilometres (7.5 mi) northwest
- Ossoliński Palace in Rudka - 7 kilometres (4.3 mi) west

== Notable people ==
- Jan Klemens Branicki – Polish nobleman
- Cezary Kosiński – Polish actor
- Ignatius Kapitsa-Milewski – archivist and author
- Shimon Shkop – Jewish scholar and rabbi (1860–1939)
- Moshe Rosen (Nezer HaKodesh) - Jewish scholar and rabbi (1870–1957)
- Zofia Drzewiecka – Recipient of the Righteous among the Nations Medal
- Waclawa and Pawel Sobolewski – posthumous recipients of the Righteous among the Nations Medal
- Antoni Sobolewski – posthumous recipient of the Righteous among the Nations Medal
- Aleksander Sobolewski – posthumous recipient of the Righteous among the Nations Medal

== Miscellanea ==
- The Righteous among the Nations Medal has been granted to 14 current and former residents of Brańsk by Yad Vashem.
