= Leszczka (river) =

Location
- Country: Poland
- Voivodeship: Podlaskie

Physical characteristics
- Source
  - location: west of Żurobice, Siemiatycze County
  - coordinates: 53°31′03″N 22°54′08″E
  - elevation: 162 m (531 ft)
- Mouth: Nurzec
  - location: east of Burchaty, Bielsk County
  - coordinates: 52.6878°N 22.9339°E
  - elevation: 129.6 m (425 ft)

Basin features
- Progression: Nurzec→ Bug→ Narew→ Vistula→ Baltic Sea
- Tributaries
  - left: Czarna

The Leszczka is a river of Poland, and a tributary of the Nurzec southeast of Brańsk.
