= 13th Mechanized Corps =

- Active: 1941
- Country: Soviet Union
- Branch: Red Army
- Type: Mechanized corps
- Engagements: World War II: Battle of Białystok–Minsk

Commanders
- Notable commanders: Pyotr Akhlyustin

The 13th Mechanized Corps (Military Unit Number 9825) was a mechanized corps of the Red Army, formed in March 1941. Stationed in the Białystok salient, the corps was destroyed during the Battle of Białystok–Minsk.

== History ==
=== Formation ===
The 13th Mechanized Corps was formed in March 1941 in Bielsk Podlaski as part of the 10th Army in the Western Special Military District. Major General Pyotr Akhlyustin commanded the corps, Major General Vasily Ivanov was its deputy commander for combat troops, and Colonel Ivan Grizunov was its chief of staff. The division's 25th Tank Division was formed from the 44th Light Tank Brigade at Gomel and was later relocated to Łapy. The division had most of the corps' tanks. The 31st Tank Division was formed from the 1st Tank Brigade (Second Formation) at Gmina Boćki. By 30 May, the division had only one full tank regiment, the 62nd, with few armored vehicles. The 208th Motorized Division was formed at Hajnówka from the 14th Motorized Machine Gun-Artillery Brigade. With its positions in the center of the Białystok salient, the corps was to support the 5th Rifle Corps. By 22 June, when the German invasion of the Soviet Union began, the corps had 294 light tanks, including 263 T-26s and 15 BT tanks. A small number of T-34 and KV-1 tanks were transferred to the corps from the 6th Mechanized Corps for training purposes. The corps was at 49 percent of its strength.

=== Battle ===
The corps was alerted on the night of 22 June. At 0200 in the morning corps headquarters moved into the forest 15 kilometers southwest of Bielsk Podlaski. The first staff echelon of the 2nd Rifle Corps from Minsk moved into the 13th Mechanized Corps' former headquarters at Bielsk Podlaski. On the morning of 22 June, the motorized infantry of the 6th and 13th Mechanized Corps began to prepare positions on the Narew from Żółtki to Suraz and onwards to Topczewo, Brańsk, and Gmina Boćki. The 13th Mechanized Corps fought the vanguard of the German IX Army Corps. The combat-ready units of the 31st Tank Division blocked the Drohiczyn-Bielsk-Białystok road. The engineers of the 31st Pontoon Bridge Battalion and the regimental school motorized regiment were defending positions five kilometers west of Gmina Boćki. Alongside them was the 157th Airfield Services Battalion, based at Dołubowo airfield. At 0800 the German troops reached the Nurzec River, resulting in heavy fighting. By the afternoon, the defenses of the 31st Tank Division had been broken through. The disorganized units of the division retreated 10 kilometers towards Gmina Boćki and Białystok.

The 25th Tank Division's reconnaissance battalion joined the battle before the rest of the division. At Brańsk the battalion blocked the advance of German units. Despite having armored vehicles, the battalion could not resist superior German troops for long. The battalion was cut to pieces and pushed back to the Nurzec. Akhlyustin sent in the 18th Motorcycle Regiment to help the battalion. Regimental commander Captain Alexey Gromov took about a hundred motorcycles and three tanks to Brańsk, but only the vanguard reached the city. The regiment suffered heavy losses, losing two out of four company commanders. The remnants of the regiment retreated towards Bielsk. A detachment of the division's 113th Tank Regiment led by Major Koshkin was sent to Brańsk. However, he "slipped" through the city and for unknown reasons moved to Bielsk. The remaining units of the regiment were attached to the infantry during the day. The 50th Tank Regiment did not see much action on 22 June. Its 3rd Battalion was sent to rescue infantry units but became stuck in a bog, losing many tanks to artillery fire. During the night the regiment moved to the area of Men. The regimental school of the 25th Motor Rifle Regiment attacked first, suffering such heavy losses that the unit essentially ceased to exist.

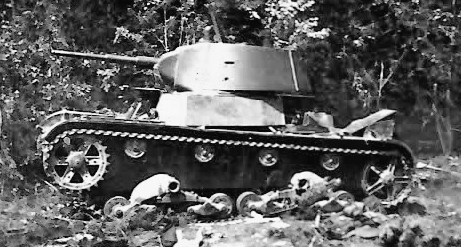
A destroyed T-26 of the type used by the corps

By 1000 on 23 June, the 25th Tank Division was holding positions at Men, Bereznitsa, and Brańsk. Its motor rifle regiment was at Raysk, Proneviche, and Gatki. The 31st Tank Division held positions at Voytki, Lyubeyki, and Andrianki. The 208th Motorized Division was at Nowosady, Hajnówka, and Lipin. Corps headquarters was in the forest north of Golody. On 23 June, the counterattack at Brańsk involved all the forces of the 25th Tank Division and 18th Motorcycle Regiment, as well as the 208th Motorized Division's 760th Motorized Regiment. The town twice was recaptured and then lost. The 25th Division began to retreat, having suffered heavy losses. The corps fought in battles around Men, the northern outskirts of Brańsk, Gmina Boćki, and Diduli. By the end of 24 June, the German troops had broken through the lines of the corps on the Orlanka at Bielsk, Narew, and Zabłudów. The corps lost all of its tanks in the fighting and with a small number of armored vehicles fought delaying actions. The units of the corps were separated and had no connection with the command, which was half-encircled. The 31st Tank Division was in Łapy, small pockets of the 208th Motorized Division were at the junction of the Nurzec and the Narew, and scattered remnants of the 25th Tank Division retreated on Vawkavysk.

The 25th and 31st Tank Divisions retreated towards the Białowieża Forest and the 208th Motorized Division moved from the Narew to Svislach and to Białystok. On 28 June German troops advancing from Bielsk and Hrodna linked up in the Berestovitsa area, splitting the Białystok pocket into several smaller pockets. The 208th Motorized Division retreated to Vawkavysk. Corps headquarters and separate groups were consolidated into a unit led by Akhlyustin. The 31st Tank Division was divided into two groups, led by Colonels Kalikhovich and Lebedev, and moved deeper into the Białowieża Forest. A covering detachment was created under the command of battalion commissar Kochetkov. The group led by Kalikhovich evaded the pursuit and went deep into the forest, where he met remnants of the 49th and 113th Rifle Divisions. Kalikhovich decided to break through to the southeast through the Pinsk Marshes. On 28 June Kalikhovich's group attacked the German positions and was initially successful. The German defenses solidified and the Soviet troops were subjected to massive aerial and artillery bombardment. In the evening Kalikhovich was seriously wounded and 62nd Tank Regiment Colonel Shapovalov, who had himself been wounded three times, took command. It was decided to break into small groups and go east through the Ruzhany forest. The group led by Kalikhovich and Shapovalov came through the encirclement and eventually reached Soviet lines. At Svislach and at Vawkavysk the 208th Motorized Division took up defensive positions, holding until 1 July. On that night, the division left Vawkavysk and began retreating. Division commander Vladimir Nichiporovich was with one of his regiments and was cut off from the headquarters. He reached Minsk with only 60 others. On 28 July, after moving through 500 kilometers of German-held territory, Akhlyustin was killed crossing the Sozh River at the positions of the 132nd Rifle Division.
