= Gmina Brańsk =

Gmina Brańsk Brańsk Commune
- Gmina
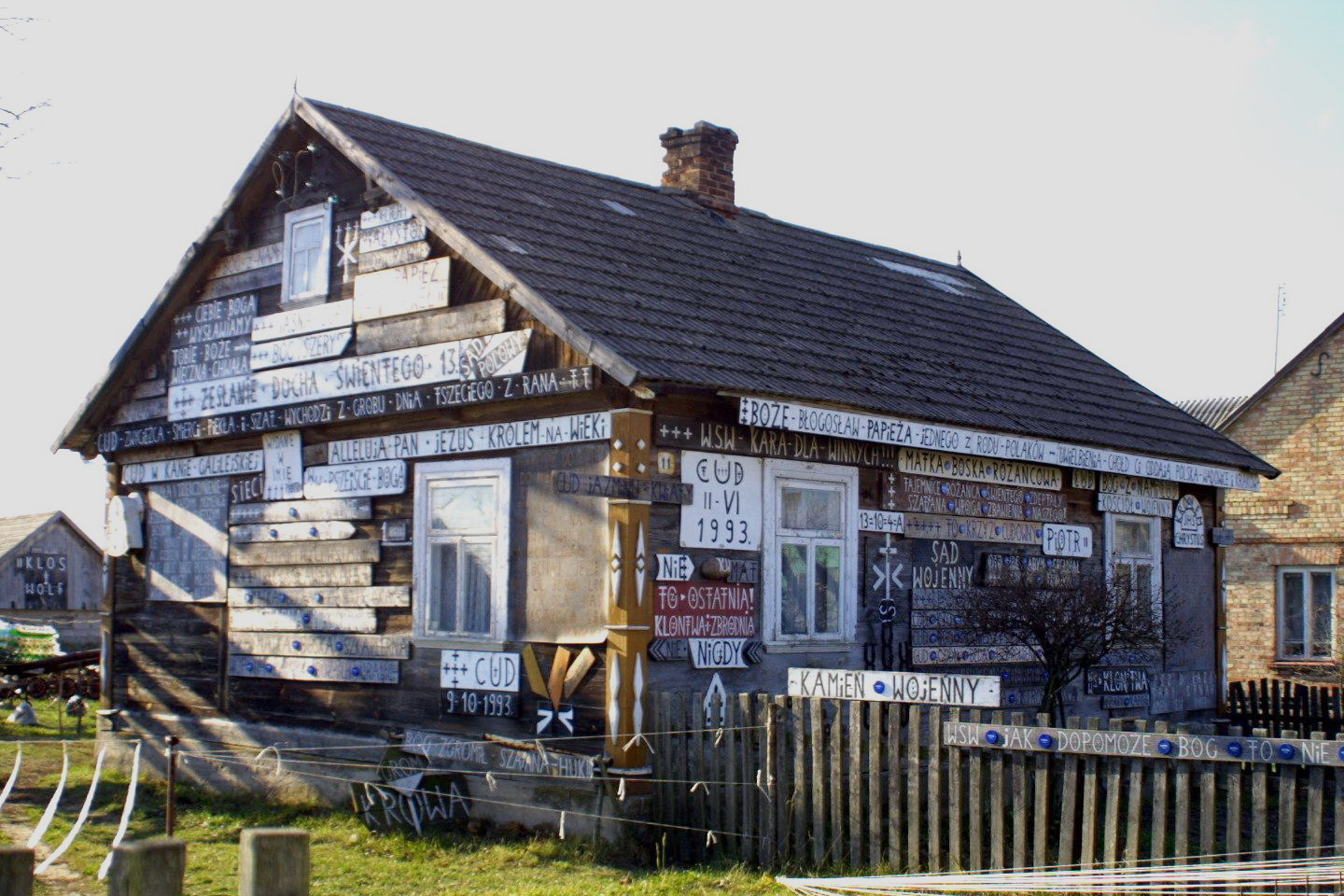
- Klichy

- Coat of arms

- Location within Poland
- Coordinates (Brańsk): 52°45′N 22°50′E
- Country: Poland
- Voivodeship: Podlaskie
- County: Bielsk
- Seat: Brańsk

Government
  - Mayor: Krzysztof Jaworowski

Area
  - Total: 227.3 km^{2} (87.8 sq mi)

Population (2007)
  - Total: 6,370
  - Density: 28.0/km^{2} (72.6/sq mi)
- Time zone: UTC+1 (CET)
  - Summer (DST): UTC+2 (CEST)
- Postal code: 17-120
- Area code: +48 085
- Car plates: BBI
- Website: http://www.ug.bransk.wrotapodlasia.pl/

Gmina Brańsk [braɲsk] is a rural gmina (Polish:gmina wiejska) in Bielsk County, Podlaskie Voivodeship. It is located in north-eastern Poland.

== Etymology ==
The name Brańsk comes from the river Bronka, a nearby tributary of the Nurzec River.

== Geography ==
Gmina Brańsk is located in the geographical region of Europe known as the Wysoczyzny Podlasko – Białoruskie (Podlaskie and Belarus Plateau) and the mezoregion known as the Równina Bielska (Bielska Plain).

The gmina covers an area of 227.3 square kilometres (87.8 sq mi).

=== Location ===
It is located approximately:

- 140 kilometres (87.0 mi) north-east of Warsaw, the capital of Poland
- 69 kilometres (42.9 mi) south-west of Białystok, the capital of the Podlaskie Voivodeship
- 25 kilometres (15.5 mi) west of Bielsk Podlaski, the seat of Bielsk County

=== Climate ===
The region has a continental climate which is characterized by high temperatures during summer and long and frosty winters . The average amount of rainfall during the year exceeds 550 millimetres (21.7 in).

=== Rivers ===
Three rivers pass through the Gmina:

- The Nurzec River, a tributary of the Bug River
- The Siennica River, a tributary of the Nurzec River
- The Czarna River, a tributary of the Nurzec River

== Demographics ==
Detailed data as of 31 December 2007:

	Total		Women		Men	
Unit	Number	%	Number	%	Number	%
Population	6,370	100	3,127	49.1	3,243	50.9
Population Density (persons/km²)	28.0		13.8		14.3	

== Municipal government ==
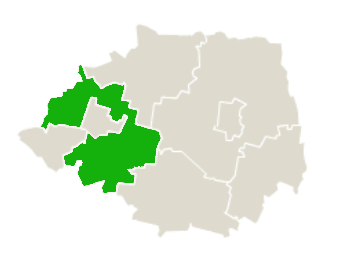
Gmina Brańsk in Bielsk County

Its seat is the town of Brańsk, although the town is not part of the territory of the gmina.

=== Executive branch ===
The chief executive of the government is the mayor (Polish: wójt).

=== Legislative branch ===
The legislative portion of the government is the Council (Polish: Rada) composed of the President (Polish: Przewodniczący), the Vice President (Polish: Wiceprzewodniczący) and thirteen councilors.

=== Villages ===
The following villages are contained within the gmina:

Bronka, Brzeźnica, Burchaty, Chojewo, Chojewo-Kolonia, Chrościanka, Dębowo, Domanowo, Ferma, Glinnik, Holonki, Jarmarkowszczyzna, Kadłubówka, Kalnica, Kalnowiec, Kiersnowo, Kiersnówek, Kiewłaki, Klichy, Konotopa, Koszewo, Lubieszcze, Majerowizna, Markowo, Mień, Nowosady, Oleksin, Olędy, Olędzkie, Olszewek, Olszewo, Otapy, Pace, Pasieka, Patoki, Pietraszki, Płonowo, Poletyły, Popławy, Pruszanka Stara, Pruszanka-Baranki, Puchały Nowe, Puchały Stare, Spieszyn, Szmurły, Ściony, Świrydy, Widźgowo, Załuskie Koronne, Załuskie Kościelne, Zanie.

=== Neighbouring political subdivisions ===
Gmina Brańsk is bordered by the town of Brańsk and the Gminy of Bielsk Podlaski, Boćki, Dziadkowice, Grodzisk, Klukowo, Nowe Piekuty, Poświętne, Rudka, Szepietowo and Wyszki.

== Transport ==
=== Roads and Highways ===
Gmina Brańsk is at the intersection of a National Road and a Voivodeship Road:

- National Road 66 DK 66 - Zambrów - Brańsk - Bielsk Podlaski - Kleszczele - Czeremcha - Połowce Border Crossing (Belarus)
- Voivodeship Road 681 DW 681 - Roszki-Wodźki - Łapy - Brańsk - Ciechanowiec

=== Public Transport ===
==== Bus Service ====
Regular bus service is provided in the town of Brańsk by Państwowa Komunikacja Samochodowa (State Car Communication, PKS) via PKS Bielsk Podlaskie, PKS Białystok and PKS Siemiatycze

==== Rail Service ====
The closest passenger train service is provided by Polskie Koleje Państwowe (Polish State Railways, PKP) SA from the following stations:

- Szepietowo - express & local service to Warsaw and Białystok - 28 kilometres (17.4 mi) northwest
- Bielsk Podlaski - express & local service to Siedlce and Białystok - 25 kilometres (15.5 mi) east

== Nearby Attractions ==
- Sanktuarium Matki Bożej Pojedniania w Hodyszewie (Our Lady of Hodyszewo Sanctuary) in Hodyzewo - 12 kilometres (7.5 mi) northwest
- Ossoliński Palace in Rudka - 7 kilometres (4.3 mi) west
