= Ferma =

Ferma may refer to:

- Ferma, Greece, a village in Crete
- Ferma, Poland, a village in Podlaskie Voivodeship of Poland
- Ferma, Russia, several rural localities in Russia
- Ferma (TV series), the Romanian version of the reality television show The Farm

== See also ==
- Fermo, a town and comune of the Marche, Italy
- Province of Fermo, Italy
