= 208th Motorized Division =

- Country: Soviet Union
- Branch: Red Army
- Type: Infantry
- Size: Division
- Engagements: Operation Barbarossa

The 208th Motorized Division was a Soviet infantry division in the Red Army during World War II. It began Operation Barbarossa as the 208th Mechanized Division under Colonel V.I. Nichiporovich, with the 128th Tank Regiment and 752nd and 760th Motorized Rifle Regiments. The Division was part of the 13th Mechanized Corps, 10th Army, Soviet Western Front. Unusually, Colonel Nichiporovich managed to keep a large group of men together after the destruction of his division during the border battles, and kept on the fight as 'Detachment No.208,' one of the first units of the Soviet partisans in Belarus.

== Composition ==
The division was composed of the following units on 22 June 1941.

- 752nd Motor Rifle Regiment
- 760th Motor Rifle Regiment
- 662nd Artillery Regiment
- 128th Armored Regiment
- 227th Reconnaissance Battalion
- 594th Separate Signal Battalion
- 376th Light Engineer Battalion
- 193rd Separate Antiaircraft Artillery Battalion
- 33rd Separate Tank Destroyer Battalion
- 367th Medical Battalion
- 471st Field Bakery
- 117th Repair and Restoration Battalion
- 206th Artillery Park Battalion
- 683rd Motor Transport battalion
- 45th Regulatory Company
- 929th Field Office of the State Bank
