= Battle of Brańsk =

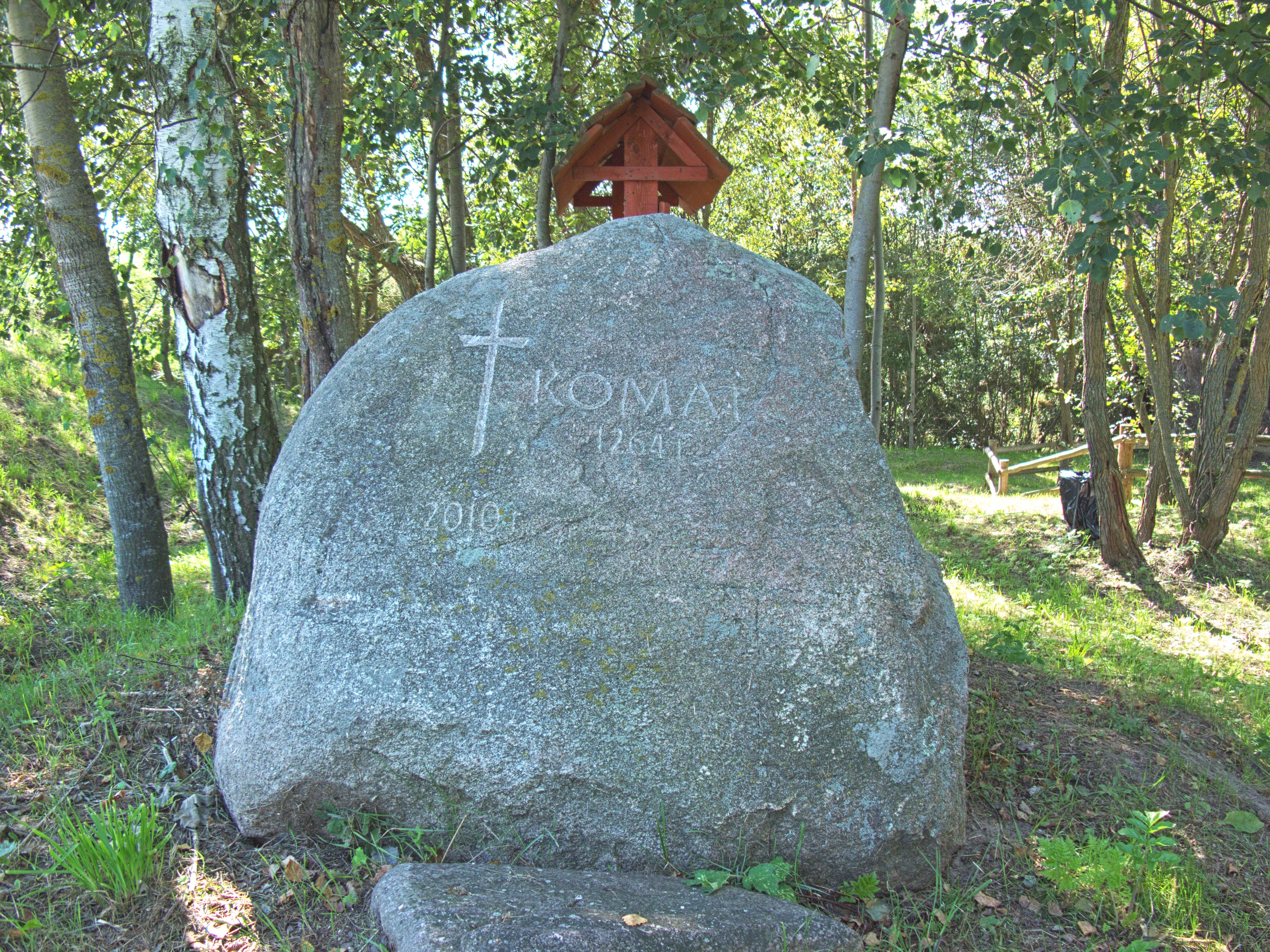
- Commemorative boulder in the Kumat Wilderness
Date	23–25 June 1264
Location	Brańsk, Poland 52°45′N 22°50′E
Result	Polish (Krakovian) victory

Belligerents
Duchy of Kraków	Yotvingia Supporter by: Kingdom of Galicia–Volhynia

Commanders and leaders
Boleslaw V the Chaste	Komata †

The Battle of Brańsk — In 1264, the Duke of Krakow, Boleslaw V the Chaste organized an expedition against Yotvingia, who were allied with Shvarn, the Duke of the Kingdom of Galicia–Volhynia. The immediate cause of the expedition was the Yotvingian raid into Polish territories in 1264 during which they ravished and plundered the country.

On 23 June 1264 the two armies met near Brańsk. The Battle of Brańsk lasted two days pitting the forces of Yotvingia, led by Komata (Kumata) against the well prepared and organized Polish (Krakovian) army. The Yotvingian forces were routed in a bloody battle and Komata was killed. Despite the defeat of the Yotvingian forces, skirmishes occurred for another 20 years until the Battle of the Narew River.

== Bibliography ==
- (in Polish) Piotr Bunar, Stanisław A. Sroka, Słownik wojen, bitew i potyczek w średniowiecznej Polsce, wyd. Universitas 2004.
