= Konotopa =

Konotopa may refer to the following places:

- Konotopa, Mława County in Masovian Voivodeship (east-central Poland)
- Konotopa, Warsaw West County in Masovian Voivodeship (east-central Poland)
- Konotopa, Podlaskie Voivodeship (north-east Poland)

== See also ==
- Konotop (disambiguation)
