= Mień =

- Village
- Location within Poland
- Coordinates: 52°46′N 22°42′E
- Country: Poland
- Voivodeship: Podlaskie
- County: Bielsk
- Gmina: Brańsk

Population
  - Total: 610
- Time zone: UTC+1 (CET)
  - Summer (DST): UTC+2 (CEST)
- Vehicle registration: BBI

Mień [mjɛɲ] is a village in the administrative district of Gmina Brańsk, within Bielsk County, Podlaskie Voivodeship, in eastern Poland.

It is situated on the Mianka River, a tributary of Nurzec.

== History ==
According to the 1921 census, the village was inhabited by 503 people, among whom 495 were Roman Catholic and 8 were Jewish. At the same time, 495 inhabitants declared Polish nationality and 8 Jewish. There were 73 residential buildings in the village.

During the German invasion of Poland at the start of World War II, on September 13, 1939, it was the site of a battle between the Polish 10th Lithuanian Uhlan Regiment and German 2nd Infantry Division. In revenge for the Polish defense, German soldiers burned down the village and massacred nine residents (see Nazi crimes against the Polish nation).

== Transport ==
The national road 66 passes nearby, north of the village.
