= Konotop (disambiguation) =

Konotop is a city in Sumy Oblast, northern Ukraine.

Konotop may also refer to the following places:

- In Ukraine:
  - Konotop, Chernihiv Oblast
  - Konotop, Khmelnytskyi Oblast
- In Poland:
  - Konotop, Lubusz Voivodeship (west Poland)
  - Konotop, Choszczno County in West Pomeranian Voivodeship (north-west Poland)
  - Konotop, Drawsko County in West Pomeranian Voivodeship (north-west Poland)

Konotop is also a surname:

- Kamila Konotop (born 2001), Ukrainian weightlifter

== See also ==
- Konotopa (disambiguation)
