= Chojewo =

- Village
- Location within Poland
- Coordinates: 52°42′20″N 22°57′42″E
- Country: Poland
- Voivodeship: Podlaskie
- County: Bielsk
- Gmina: Brańsk

Chojewo [xɔˈjɛvɔ] is a village in the administrative district of Gmina Brańsk, within Bielsk County, Podlaskie Voivodeship, in north-eastern Poland.

According to the 1921 census, the village was inhabited by 396 people, among whom 11 were Roman Catholic, 51 were Orthodox, and 4 were Mosaic. At the same time, all inhabitants declared Polish nationality. There were 74 residential buildings in the village.
