= Kadłubówka, Podlaskie Voivodeship =

Kadłubówka
- Village
- Location within Poland
- Coordinates: 52°45′N 22°58′E
- Country: Poland
- Voivodeship: Podlaskie
- County: Bielsk
- Gmina: Brańsk

Kadłubówka [kadwuˈbufka] is a village in the administrative district of Gmina Brańsk, within Bielsk County, Podlaskie Voivodeship, in north-eastern Poland.
