= Pietraszki, Podlaskie Voivodeship =

Pietraszki
- Village
- Location within Poland
- Coordinates: 52°48′N 22°46′E
- Country: Poland
- Voivodeship: Podlaskie
- County: Bielsk
- Gmina: Brańsk

Pietraszki [pjɛˈtraʂki] is a village in the administrative district of Gmina Brańsk, within Bielsk County, Podlaskie Voivodeship, in north-eastern Poland.
