= Marian Marzyński =

Polish-American filmmaker (1937–2023)

- Born: Marian Kuszner; 12 April 1937; Warsaw, Poland
- Died: 4 April 2023 (aged 85)
- Citizenship: American
- Occupation: Documentary filmmaker
- Years active: 1951–2016
- Notable work: Never Forget to Lie, Shtetl
- Spouse: Grazyna Marzyński
- Children: 2
- Website: lifeonmarz.com

Marian Marzyński (né Kuszner; 12 April 1937 – 4 April 2023) was a Polish-American documentary filmmaker.

== Career ==
Marzyński was born in Warsaw on 12 April 1937. A child survivor of the Holocaust, he spent more than 40 years working in the media. He began in his native country of Poland as a journalist and television show host, developing such programs as Tournament of Towns. In 1969 he moved to Denmark, and subsequently to the United States after being offered a teaching job in the newly formed film department of the Rhode Island School of Design (RISD).

Marzyński worked alongside fellow Jewish Polish director Roman Polanski, as well as taught young American filmmakers such as Gus Van Sant and Jean de Segonzac at RISD. His documentaries for the television program FRONTLINE include Never Forget to Lie (2013), A Jew Among the Germans (2005), Shtetl (1996), After Gorbachev's USSR (1992), Betting on the Lottery (1990), My Retirement Dreams (1988), and Welcome to America (1984).

Marzyński was selected as a Guggenheim fellow in 1982, and won an Emmy Award for his documentary work in both 1986 and 1990.

== Personal life ==
Marzyński married Grażyna, an architect. They had two children, Bartosz and Anya.

== Awards ==
Marzyński won the following awards:

- '97 Silver Baton for Excellence in Radio/Television Journalism, duPont- Columbia University (Shtetl)
- '96 First Prize, Jerusalem International Film Festival (Shtetl)
- '96 Grand Prix at the Cinema Du Reel - Paris, France (Shtetl)
- '92 George Polk Award in broadcasting journalism (Inside Gorbachev's USSR)
- '91 Alfred I. duPont-Columbia Golden Baton for excellence in broadcasting journalism (Inside Gorbachev's USSR)
- '91 Retirement Research Foundation Media Award (God Bless America and Poland, Too)
- '90 Emmy Award for producing a Documentary (Messenger to Poland)
- '86 Emmy Award for writing in Documentary (Out of the Shadows)
- '82 Guggenheim Fellowship in Documentary Filmmaking
- '67 Silver Dragon (To Be)
- '66 Bronze Hobby-Horse of Cracow (Before the Tournament)
- '66 Silver Dragon (Before the Tournament)
- '64 Golden Dragon (Return of the Ship)
- '64 Golden Hobby-Horse of Cracow (Return of the Ship)

== Filmography ==
Marzyński directed the following films:

- Do You Speak Chopin? (2016)
- Never Forget to Lie / Frontline (2013)
- Jewish Blues (2011)
- Poland: Chopin's Heart / Frontline World (2007)
- A Jew Among the Germans / Frontline (2005)
- Anya (In and Out of Focus) (2004)
- Ja, Gombro (2004)
- Patriots Day / American Experience (2004)
- Rich in Russia / Frontline World (2003)
- Romania: My Old Haunts / Frontline World (2002)
- The Killer's Trail: The Story of Dr. Sam Sheppard / Nova (1999)
- My Retirement Dreams / Frontline (1998)
- Shtetl / Frontline (1996)
- Mysterious Crash of Flight 201 / Nova (1993)
- Fra Hofteatret: Sorte øjne (1974)
- Day X (1967)
- To Be (1967)
- Parent-Teacher Conference (1967)
- Before the Tournament (1966)
- We Apologize for All Inconveniences (1966)
- The Auction (1965)
- Farewell to Fatherland (1964)
- Return of the Ship (1964)
