= Płonowo =

- Village
- Location within Poland
- Coordinates: 52°41′N 22°49′E
- Country: Poland
- Voivodeship: Podlaskie
- County: Bielsk
- Gmina: Brańsk

Płonowo [pwɔˈnɔvɔ] is a village in the administrative district of Gmina Brańsk, within Bielsk County, Podlaskie Voivodeship, in north-eastern Poland.

According to the 1921 census, the village was inhabited by 147 people, among whom 141 were Roman Catholic, 2 were Orthodox, and 4 were Mosaic. At the same time, 143 inhabitants declared Polish nationality, 4 declared Jewish nationality. There were 28 residential buildings in the village.
