= Widźgowo =

- Village
- Location within Poland
- Coordinates: 52°39′46″N 22°53′7″E
- Country: Poland
- Voivodeship: Podlaskie
- County: Bielsk
- Gmina: Brańsk

Widźgowo [vʲid͡ʑˈɡɔvɔ] is a village in the administrative district of Gmina Brańsk, within Bielsk County, Podlaskie Voivodeship, in north-eastern Poland.
