= Ferma, Russia =

Ferma (Russian: Ферма) is the name of several rural localities in Russia:

- Ferma, Novosibirsk Oblast, a railway halt platform in Moshkovsky District of Novosibirsk Oblast
- Ferma, Perm Krai, a settlement in Permsky District of Perm Krai
- Ferma, Saratov Oblast, a khutor in Saratovsky District of Saratov Oblast
