= Holonki =

- Village
- Location within Poland
- Coordinates: 52°39′43″N 22°51′59″E
- Country: Poland
- Voivodeship: Podlaskie
- County: Bielsk
- Gmina: Brańsk

Holonki [xɔˈlɔnkʲi] is a village in the administrative district of Gmina Brańsk, within Bielsk County, Podlaskie Voivodeship, in north-eastern Poland.

According to the 1921 census, the village was inhabited by 258 people, among whom 235 were Roman Catholic, 16 were Orthodox, and 7 were Mosaic. At the same time, all inhabitants declared Polish nationality. There were 39 residential buildings in the village.
