= Chojewo-Kolonia =

- Settlement
- Location within Poland
- Coordinates: 52°43′04″N 22°59′10″E
- Country: Poland
- Voivodeship: Podlaskie
- County: Bielsk
- Gmina: Brańsk

Chojewo-Kolonia [xɔˈjɛvɔ kɔˈlɔɲa] is a settlement in the administrative district of Gmina Brańsk, within Bielsk County, Podlaskie Voivodeship, in north-eastern Poland.
