= Pyotr Akhlyustin =

Russian military man

Pyotr Nikolayevich Akhlyustin
- Akhlyustin in 1940
- Born: 12 June 1896; Kaslinsky Zavod, Yekaterinburgsky Uyezd, Perm Governorate, Russian Empire
- Died: 28 July 1941 (aged 45) Near Propoysk, Mogilev Oblast, Belorussian SSR, Soviet Union
- Allegiance: Russian Empire; Russian SFSR; Soviet Union
- Branch: Imperial Russian Army; Red Army (later Soviet Army)
- Service years: 1915–1917; 1918–1941
- Rank: Major general
- Commands: 23rd Cavalry Division; 24th Cavalry Division; 13th Mechanized Corps
- Conflicts: World War I; Russian Civil War; World War II
- Awards: Order of the Red Banner; Order of the Red Star (2)

Pyotr Nikolayevich Akhlyustin (Russian: Пётр Николаевич Ахлюстин; 12 June 1896 – 28 July 1941) was a Red Army major general.

Akhlyustin fought in World War I as a cavalryman and joined the Red Army during the Russian Civil War, becoming a junior commander. He held command positions in cavalry units between the wars and commanded a cavalry division in the Soviet invasion of Poland and the Winter War. At the outbreak of Operation Barbarossa, he commanded the 13th Mechanized Corps, destroyed during the Battle of Białystok–Minsk in late June and early July 1941. Akhlyustin escaped, but was killed while trying to reach Soviet lines in late July.

== Early life, World War I, and Russian Civil War ==
Akhlyustin was born on 12 June 1896 in Kaslinsky Zavod, the son of a worker, and graduated from primary school. During World War I, he was drafted into the Imperial Russian Army in August 1915 and sent to the Western Front, where he fought with the 2nd Pavlograd Life Hussar Regiment as a private, junior unter-ofitser and assistant platoon commander. Akhlyustin received two Crosses of St. George for his actions. Demobilized in December 1917 after the Russian Revolution, he returned to his hometown to work as a fireman at the Kasli metallurgical plant.

Akhlyustin joined the Red Army on 24 June 1918 during the Russian Civil War, serving with the cavalry sotnya of the 267th Mountain Rifle Regiment as a platoon commander and assistant sotnya commander. On 11 June 1920 he was appointed chief of the machine gun detachment of the 3rd Special Purpose Battalion of the Southern Front, and in May 1921 returned to the 267th Rifle Regiment to serve as a rifle company and sotnya commander. During the war he saw action on the Eastern and Southern Fronts.

== Interwar period ==
Akhlyustin served with the 30th Rifle Division from December 1922 as commander of a training platoon of the divisional school, and from August 1923 served successively as a platoon commander, and assistant commander and acting commander of a squadron. He transferred to the separate cavalry squadron of the 51st Rifle Division, part of the Ukrainian Military District, in November 1924, serving successively as assistant commander and commander of the squadron. After graduating from the Simferopol Command Course in 1926, Akhlyustin was sent to study at the Novocherkassk Cavalry Officers Improvement Course in October 1927, from which he completed in August 1928. He became head of the economic section at the Budyonny Ukrainian Cavalry School in November 1929, and from January 1931 served as assistant commander and then commander of the 2nd Reserve Cavalry Regiment of the district.

Transferred to the 26th Cavalry Division to command its 104th Cavalry Regiment in April 1935, Akhlyustin later became commander of the 10th Cavalry Regiment of the 23rd Cavalry Division, being promoted to colonel on 24 January 1936. He took command of the division, part of the 7th Cavalry Corps of the Kiev Military District, in September 1937, and was promoted to kombrig on 17 February 1938. Another transfer to command the 24th Cavalry Division of the 13th Cavalry Corps of the Belorussian Special Military District in June of that year followed as the Red Army expanded its cavalry force. Akhlyustin commanded the division in the Soviet invasion of Poland and the Winter War, and became a major general on 4 June 1940 when the Red Army reintroduced general officer ranks. An order of 15 February 1941 appointed Akhlyustin commander of the 39th Rifle Corps of the 1st Red Banner Army of the Far Eastern Front, but on 27 February it was rescinded and instead he became commander of the 13th Mechanized Corps of the 10th Army of the Western Special Military District (the former Belorussian Special Military District).

== World War II ==
After Operation Barbarossa, the German invasion of the Soviet Union, began, Akhlyustin's corps fought in the Battle of Białystok–Minsk and was almost completely wiped out, encircled in the Bialystok pocket. Akhlyustin escaped to positions held by the 13th Army on the Dnieper and continued east when these too collapsed. On 28 July, while organizing the breakout from the encirclement of the corps, which had run out of ammunition, fuel, and lubricants, Akhlyustin was killed while attempting to cross the Sozh River near Propoysk. He was survived by his wife, Mariya Nikolayevna, who lived in Magnitogorsk.

== Awards and honors ==
Akhlyustin received the following awards and decorations:

- Order of the Red Banner
- Order of the Patriotic War, 1st class (posthumous)
- Order of the Red Star (2)
- Jubilee Medal "XX Years of the Workers' and Peasants' Red Army" (1938)
- Cross of St. George 3rd and 4th class (not worn after 1917)
