= Markowo, Podlaskie Voivodeship =

Markowo
- Village
- Location within Poland
- Coordinates: 52°49′N 22°45′E
- Country: Poland
- Voivodeship: Podlaskie
- County: Bielsk
- Gmina: Brańsk

Markowo [marˈkɔvɔ] is a village in the administrative district of Gmina Brańsk, within Bielsk County, Podlaskie Voivodeship, in north-eastern Poland.
