= Battle of the Narew River =

Date	1282
Location	Narew river
Result	Polish victory

Belligerents
Grand Duchy of Lithuania; Yotvingians	Duchy of Kraków

Commanders and leaders
Unknown	Leszek the black

Strength
14,000	6,000

Casualties and losses
7,000 killed or seriously injured	Light

The Battle of the Narew River was fought on 13 October 1282 between the armies of the Duke of Krakow Leszek the Black and the allied armies of the Lithuanians and the Yotvingians. The battle ended with a Polish victory

== The Battle ==
In the autumn of 1282, a combined force of Lithuanians and Yotvingians, claimed to number 14,000 armed men, invaded Lubelszczyzna. The names of the commanders of this force were not recorded. The invading forces were divided into three divisions. After ravaging the Lublin region, they retreated with large booty. While retreating, the Lithuanian-Yotvingian army clashed with the pursuing Polish army led by Leszek the Black at an unknown location between Narew and Nemunas.

The battle is believed to have occurred:

- near Brańsk, on the rivers Nurek and Branka,
- on the Narew River near Długosiodło,
- near Wasilkow on the Supraśl River,
- on the fields of the villages Łopiennik and Krzywe,
- on the estuary of the Czarna Hańcza River to the Nemunas River, near the village of Jatwieź Duża. (Note: The Black Hancza flows into the Niemen outside Poland's borders. Both parts of the sentence are therefore contradictory.)

A Polish army of 6,000 men split the opposing forces and, after the Lithuanians had fled, crushed the army of the Yotvingians. After the victory, the Polish army went on to plunder the Bialystok Highlands. It is believed that the military strength of the Yotvingians was shattered during this battle, and the invasion in 1283 was the last raiding attack of this fierce tribe on Poland.

== Sources ==
- Strzelczyk, Jerzy (2006). Zapomniane narody Europy (in Polish). Wrocław: Ossolineum. ISBN 9788304047693.
- Bunar, Piotr; Sroka, Stanisław (2004). Słownik wojen, bitew i potyczek w średniowiecznej Polsce (in Polish). Kraków: Universitas. ISBN 8324203974.
- "Rocznica bitwy nad Narwią i zagłada Jaćwingów. Możliwe, że doszło do niej pod Brańskiem". Bielsk.eu (in Polish). 2020.
