= Chrościanka =

Settlement in Gmina Brańsk, Poland

- Settlement
- Location within Poland
- Coordinates: 52°43′59″N 22°59′17″E
- Country: Poland
- Voivodeship: Podlaskie
- County: Bielsk
- Gmina: Brańsk

Chrościanka [xrɔɕˈt͡ɕanka] is a settlement in the administrative district of Gmina Brańsk, within Bielsk County, Podlaskie Voivodeship, in north-eastern Poland.
