= Shtetl (film) =

- Genre: Documentary
- Directed by: Marian Marzynski
- Country of origin: United States
- Original language: English

Original release
- Release: April 17, 1996

Shtetl is a 1996 American documentary film that was produced and directed by Marian Marzynski. The film aired April 17, 1996 on the Frontline series on PBS. The film recounts the history of the Polish village of Brańsk that had a substantial population of Jewish residents. During World War II the Germans occupied the village of Brańsk and sent 2,000 Jews to the Treblinka extermination camp. The film also examines the role of Polish anti-Semitism during the German occupation of Poland and lingering anti-Semitism during documentary's filming.

== See also ==
- Virtual Shtetl
- Return to My Shtetl Delatyn
