= Klichy =

- Village
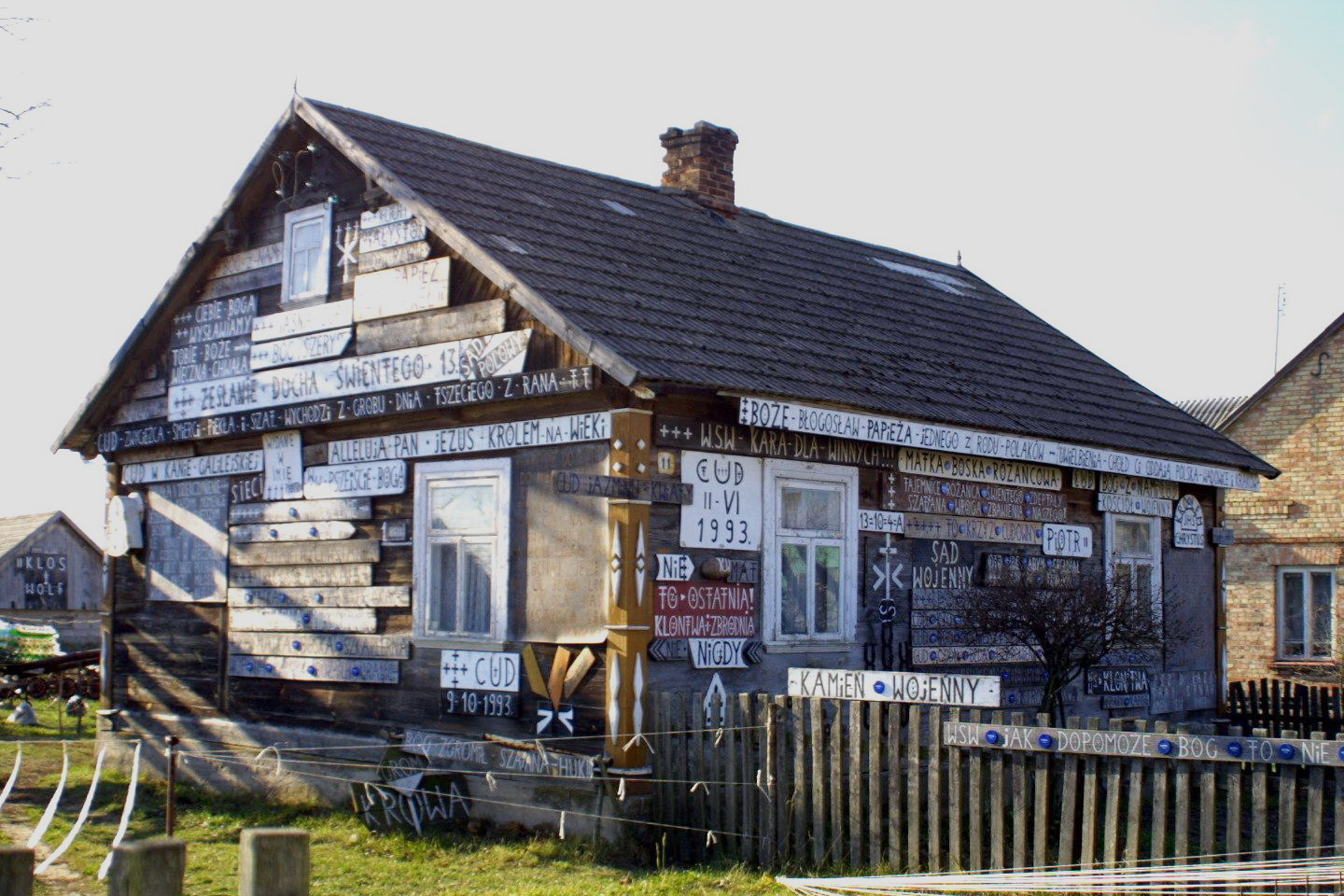

- Location within Poland
- Coordinates: 52°40′N 22°55′E
- Country: Poland
- Voivodeship: Podlaskie
- County: Bielsk
- Gmina: Brańsk

Klichy [ˈklʲixɨ] is a village in the administrative district of Gmina Brańsk, within Bielsk County, Podlaskie Voivodeship, in north-eastern Poland.

According to the 1921 census, the village was inhabited by 316 people, among whom 303 were Roman Catholic, 9 were Orthodox, and 4 were Mosaic. At the same time, 315 inhabitants declared Polish nationality, and 1 declared Belarusian nationality. There were 56 residential buildings in the village.
