= 208th Rifle Division =

Soviet infantry

The 208th Rifle Division was a Soviet infantry division in the Red Army during World War II. It began Operation Barbarossa as the 208th Mechanized Division under Colonel V.I. Nichiporovich, with the 128th Tank Regiment and 752nd and 760th Motorized Rifle Regiments. The Division was part of the 13th Mechanized Corps, 10th Army, Soviet Western Front. Unusually, Colonel Nichiporovich managed to keep a large group of men together after the destruction of his division during the border battles, and kept on the fight as 'Detachment No.208,' one of the first units of the Soviet partisans in Belarus.

In 1942 the Division, under Col. K. M. Vysokoboinikov, was part of the 64th Army which fought in the Battle of Stalingrad.

On 6 April 1945, now under the title 'Siberian,' it was part of the divisions of the encirclement of Königsberg, located at the northwest sector as part of 124th Rifle Corps, 43rd Army. The division to the right is unknown, and to the left was the 216th Rifle Division. Attacked German positions and broke through the second defensive line.

The division was disbanded in the Kiev Military District along with the 124th Rifle Corps in late December 1945.

== Sources and references ==
- Feskov, V.I.; Golikov, V.I.; Kalashnikov, K.A.; Slugin, S.A. (2013). Вооруженные силы СССР после Второй Мировой войны: от Красной Армии к Советской [The Armed Forces of the USSR after World War II: From the Red Army to the Soviet: Part 1 Land Forces] (in Russian). Tomsk: Scientific and Technical Literature Publishing. ISBN 9785895035306.
- See also http://www.soldat.ru/forum/?gb=3&id=44361
