= Vladimir Nichiporovich =

Red Army general

- Born: 15 March 1900; Bogorodskoye, Moscow Governorate, Russian Empire
- Died: 31 March 1945 (aged 45) Moscow, Soviet Union
- Allegiance: Russian SFSR; Soviet Union
- Branch: Red Army
- Service years: 1917–1938; 1939–1945
- Rank: Major general
- Commands: 208th Motorized Division; Partisan Detachment No. 208
- Conflicts: October Revolution; Russian Civil War; World War II
- Awards: Order of Lenin

Vladimir Ivanovich Nichiporovich (Russian: Владимир Иванович Ничипорович; 15 March 1900 [O.S. 2 March] – 31 January 1945) was a Red Army major general during World War II who organized partisans in occupied Belarus.

He served as commander of the 208th Motorized Division, and organized and commanded Soviet partisans in the Klichaw region of occupied Belarus from late 1941 to 1942. Arrested in Moscow in May 1943 and held in the Lubyanka, he died in prison there after a hunger strike.

== Early life, revolution, and Russian Civil War ==
Nichiporovich was born on 15 March 1900 in Bogorodskoye, Moscow Governorate. He joined the Red Guards troop (druzhina) of the Moscow Post Office in October 1917 during the October Revolution and participated in fighting against Junkers during the Moscow Bolshevik Uprising while taking control of the posts, telegraph, customs, and telephone exchanges in Moscow. The troop was incorporated into the 96th Rifle Battalion of the Red Army 1st Moscow Workers' Regiment in December 1918 and sent to the Eastern Front, where it fought against the White forces of Alexander Kolchak in Vyatka Governorate during the Russian Civil War. The battalion fought against the detachments of Alexander Dutov at Sterlitamak in 1919. Nichiporovich was appointed platoon commander in February 1920 and became assistant regimental adjutant in November.

== Interwar period ==
From July 1921, Nichiporovich successively served as a machine gun platoon commander, assistant regimental adjutant, regimental adjutant, and assistant regimental chief of staff in the newly formed 1st Rifle Regiment. He studied at the cavalry department of the 6th Combined Tatar-Bashkir Military School in Kazan from October 1922, and transferred to the 39th Cavalry Regiment of the 7th Cavalry Division in the Western Military District (the Belorussian Military District from October 1926) upon his graduation two years later. With the regiment, Nichiporovich successively served as commander of cavalry and regimental school platoons, and assistant regimental chief of staff. In January 1927 he took command of a cavalry squadron of the 40th Cavalry Regiment, and from May 1929 Nichiporovich led the separate cavalry squadron of the 5th Rifle Division. He studied at the Red Banner Cavalry Commander's Refresher Courses (KUKS) in Novocherkassk from November 1930, and became assistant commander of the 39th Regiment after his May 1931 graduation. After commanding the 94th Cavalry Regiment of the 24th Cavalry Division from June 1935, he became commander of the 39th Regiment in January 1938.

Arrested by the NKVD during the Great Purge on 7 March, Nichiporovich was investigated and dismissed from the army. In December he was released from arrest after the end of the case and on 19 February 1939 he was reinstated in the army at the disposal of its Personnel Directorate. Nichiporovich was appointed commander of the 144th Cavalry Regiment of the 36th Cavalry Division in the Belorussian Special Military District in March, and made it the best in the division, for which it received a Red Banner after combat training. He transferred to command the 14th Motorized Machine Gun Artillery Brigade in November 1940, which was expanded into the 208th Motorized Division of the 13th Mechanized Corps of the 10th Army in the Western Special Military District in March 1941.

== World War II ==
Shortly after Operation Barbarossa, the German invasion of the Soviet Union, began on 22 June, the army became part of the Western Front. The 208th and its corps were positioned south of Białystok and as a result bore the brunt of the German attacks, and were encircled by the German troops. Nichiporovich formed the remnants of his division into a partisan detachment and subsequently received the Order of Lenin on 15 July 1942 for the "successful combat actions of the detachment behind enemy lines" and his "personal courage." He was evacuated to Moscow and was at the disposal of the Central Headquarters of the Partisan Movement from October 1942. Nichiporovich was appointed deputy commander of the 4th Guards Cavalry Corps in April 1943 and promoted to major general on 18 May, but later that month was again arrested by the NKVD on fabricated charges of treason, and died in prison under investigation on 31 January 1945.

He was removed from the officer list of the Red Army on 2 December 1946 as "died under investigation." He was posthumously declared fully rehabilitated by a decision of the Supreme Court of the Soviet Union with restoration of rank and awards on 4 October 1952. By an order of the Ministry of Defense on 15 August 1968, the notation on the removal of Nichiporovich from the personnel list was changed to "removed from the officer list due to death."

== Bibliography ==
- Musiał, B., Sowjetische Partisanen 1941–1944: Mythos und Wirklichkeit. Schöningh, Paderborn 2009, ISBN 978-3-506-76687-8
- Tsapayev, D. A.; et al. (2011). Великая Отечественная: Комдивы. Военный биографический словарь [The Great Patriotic War: Division Commanders. Military Biographical Dictionary] (in Russian). Vol. 1. Moscow: Kuchkovo Pole. ISBN 978-5-9950-0189-8.
- will-remember.ru
