= Domanowo, Podlaskie Voivodeship =

Domanowo
- Village
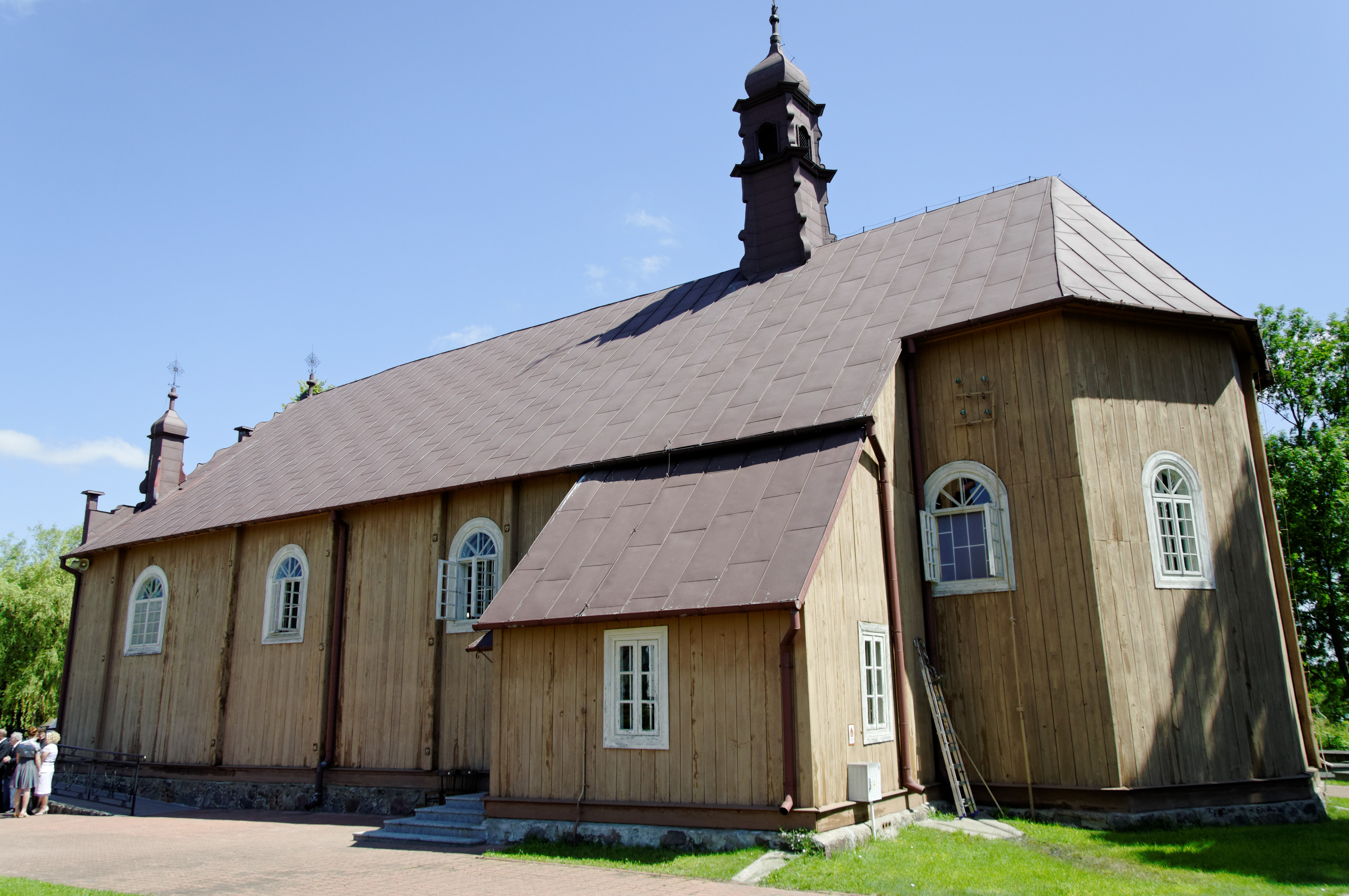
- Church of Virgin Mary, Mother of the Holy Saviour

- Location within Poland
- Coordinates: 52°47′N 22°45′E
- Country: Poland
- Voivodeship: Podlaskie
- County: Bielsk
- Gmina: Brańsk
- Time zone: UTC+1 (CET)
  - Summer (DST): UTC+2 (CEST)

Domanowo [dɔmaˈnɔvɔ] is a village in the administrative district of Gmina Brańsk, within Bielsk County, Podlaskie Voivodeship, in eastern Poland.

== History ==
According to the 1921 census, the village was inhabited by 453 people, among whom 444 were Roman Catholic, 6 were Jewish, and 3 were Orthodox. At the same time, 444 inhabitants declared Polish nationality, 6 declared Jewish nationality and 3 declared Belarusian nationality. There were 70 residential buildings in the village.

Four Polish citizens were murdered by Nazi Germany in the village during World War II.
