= Ściony =

- Village
- Location within Poland
- Coordinates: 52°50′N 22°49′E
- Country: Poland
- Voivodeship: Podlaskie
- County: Bielsk
- Gmina: Brańsk
- Postal code: 18-212
- Vehicle registration: BBI

Ściony [ˈɕt͡ɕɔnɨ] is a village in the administrative district of Gmina Brańsk, within Bielsk County, Podlaskie Voivodeship, in north-eastern Poland.

Four Polish citizens were murdered by Nazi Germany in the village during World War II.
