= Pruszanka-Baranki =

- Village
- Location within Poland
- Coordinates: 52°47′58″N 22°42′58″E
- Country: Poland
- Voivodeship: Podlaskie
- County: Bielsk
- Gmina: Brańsk
- Population: 80

Pruszanka-Baranki [pruˈʂaŋka baˈraŋki] is a village in the administrative district of Gmina Brańsk, within Bielsk County, Podlaskie Voivodeship, in north-eastern Poland.

The Baranki gentry settlement, belonging to the Pruszanka gentry area, was located in the second half of the 17th century in the Brańsk district of the Bielsk region of the Podlaskie Voivodeship.
