= Olędy, Podlaskie Voivodeship =

Olędy
- Village
- Location within Poland
- Coordinates: 52°42′N 22°46′E
- Country: Poland
- Voivodeship: Podlaskie
- County: Bielsk
- Gmina: Brańsk
- Population: 340

Olędy [ɔˈlɛndɨ] is a village in the administrative district of Gmina Brańsk, within Bielsk County, Podlaskie Voivodeship, in north-eastern Poland.
