= Koszewo, Podlaskie Voivodeship =

Koszewo
- Village
- Location within Poland
- Coordinates: 52°44′N 22°59′E
- Country: Poland
- Voivodeship: Podlaskie
- County: Bielsk
- Gmina: Brańsk

Koszewo [kɔˈʂɛvɔ] is a village in the administrative district of Gmina Brańsk, within Bielsk County, Podlaskie Voivodeship, in north-eastern Poland.

According to the 1921 census, the village was inhabited by 201 people, among whom 194 were Roman Catholic, 1 was Orthodox, and 6 were Mosaic. At the same time, all inhabitants declared Polish nationality. There were 34 residential buildings in the village.
