= Kiewłaki =

- Village
- Location within Poland
- Coordinates: 52°49′57″N 22°47′44″E
- Country: Poland
- Voivodeship: Podlaskie
- County: Bielsk
- Gmina: Brańsk
- Population (approx.): 160

Kiewłaki [kʲɛˈvwaki] is a village in the administrative district of Gmina Brańsk, within Bielsk County, Podlaskie Voivodeship, in north-eastern Poland.

According to the 1921 census, the village was inhabited by 180 people, among whom 171 were Roman Catholic, 2 were Orthodox, and 7 were Mosaic. At the same time, 179 inhabitants declared Polish nationality, 1 Belarusian. There were 23 residential buildings in the village.
