= Olędzkie =

- Village
- Location within Poland
- Coordinates: 52°48′N 22°53′E
- Country: Poland
- Voivodeship: Podlaskie
- County: Bielsk
- Gmina: Brańsk

Olędzkie [ɔˈlɛnt͡skʲɛ] is a village in the administrative district of Gmina Brańsk, within Bielsk County, Podlaskie Voivodeship, in north-eastern Poland.

According to the 1921 census, the village was inhabited by 206 people, among whom 195 were Roman Catholic, 3 were Orthodox, and 8 were Mosaic. At the same time, all inhabitants declared Polish nationality. There were 47 residential buildings in the village.
