= Kalnowiec =

- Settlement
- Location within Poland
- Coordinates: 52°44′05″N 22°55′51″E
- Country: Poland
- Voivodeship: Podlaskie
- County: Bielsk
- Gmina: Brańsk

Kalnowiec [kalˈnɔvjɛt͡s] is a settlement in the administrative district of Gmina Brańsk, within Bielsk County, Podlaskie Voivodeship, in north-eastern Poland.
