= Lubieszcze =

- Village
- Location within Poland
- Coordinates: 52°43′0″N 22°46′53″E
- Country: Poland
- Voivodeship: Podlaskie
- County: Bielsk
- Gmina: Brańsk
- Population (approx.): 210

Lubieszcze [luˈbjɛʂt͡ʂɛ] is a village in the administrative district of Gmina Brańsk, within Bielsk County, Podlaskie Voivodeship, in north-eastern Poland.
