= Olszewek, Podlaskie Voivodeship =

Olszewek
- Village
- Location within Poland
- Coordinates: 52°49′07″N 22°52′07″E
- Country: Poland
- Voivodeship: Podlaskie
- County: Bielsk
- Gmina: Brańsk

Olszewek [ɔlˈʂɛvɛk] is a village in the administrative district of Gmina Brańsk, within Bielsk County, Podlaskie Voivodeship, in north-eastern Poland.
