= Ferma, Perm Krai =

Ferma Ферма
- Settlement
- Location within Perm Krai Location within Russia
- Coordinates: 57°53′N 56°18′E
- Country: Russia
- Region: Perm Krai
- District: Permsky District
- Time zone: UTC+5:00

Ferma (Russian: Ферма) is a rural locality (a settlement) and the administrative center of Dvurechenskoye Rural Settlement, Permsky District, Perm Krai, Russia. The population was 3,786 as of 2010. There are 30 streets.

== Geography ==
Ferma is located on the Mulyanka River, 16 km south of Perm (the district's administrative centre) by road. Vashury is the nearest rural locality.
