= Kalnica, Podlaskie Voivodeship =

Kalnica
- Village
- Location within Poland
- Coordinates: 52°45′N 22°57′E
- Country: Poland
- Voivodeship: Podlaskie
- County: Bielsk
- Gmina: Brańsk

Kalnica [kalˈɲit͡sa] is a village in the administrative district of Gmina Brańsk, within Bielsk County, Podlaskie Voivodeship, in north-eastern Poland.

According to the 1921 census, the village was inhabited by 145 people, among whom 123 were Roman Catholic, 12 Orthodox, and 10 Mosaic. At the same time, 132 inhabitants declared Polish nationality, 10 declared Jewish nationality and 3 declared another nationality. There were 27 residential buildings in the village.
