= Kiersnówek =

- Village
- Location within Poland
- Coordinates: 52°44′N 22°53′E
- Country: Poland
- Voivodeship: Podlaskie
- County: Bielsk
- Gmina: Brańsk

Kiersnówek [kʲɛrsˈnuvɛk] is a village in the administrative district of Gmina Brańsk, within Bielsk County, Podlaskie Voivodeship, in north-eastern Poland.
