= Nowosady, Bielsk County =

Nowosady
- Village
- Location within Poland
- Coordinates: 52°43′39″N 22°59′39″E
- Country: Poland
- Voivodeship: Podlaskie
- County: Bielsk
- Gmina: Brańsk

Nowosady [nɔvɔˈsadɨ] is a village in the administrative district of Gmina Brańsk, within Bielsk County, Podlaskie Voivodeship, in north-eastern Poland.
