= Patoki, Podlaskie Voivodeship =

Patoki
- Village
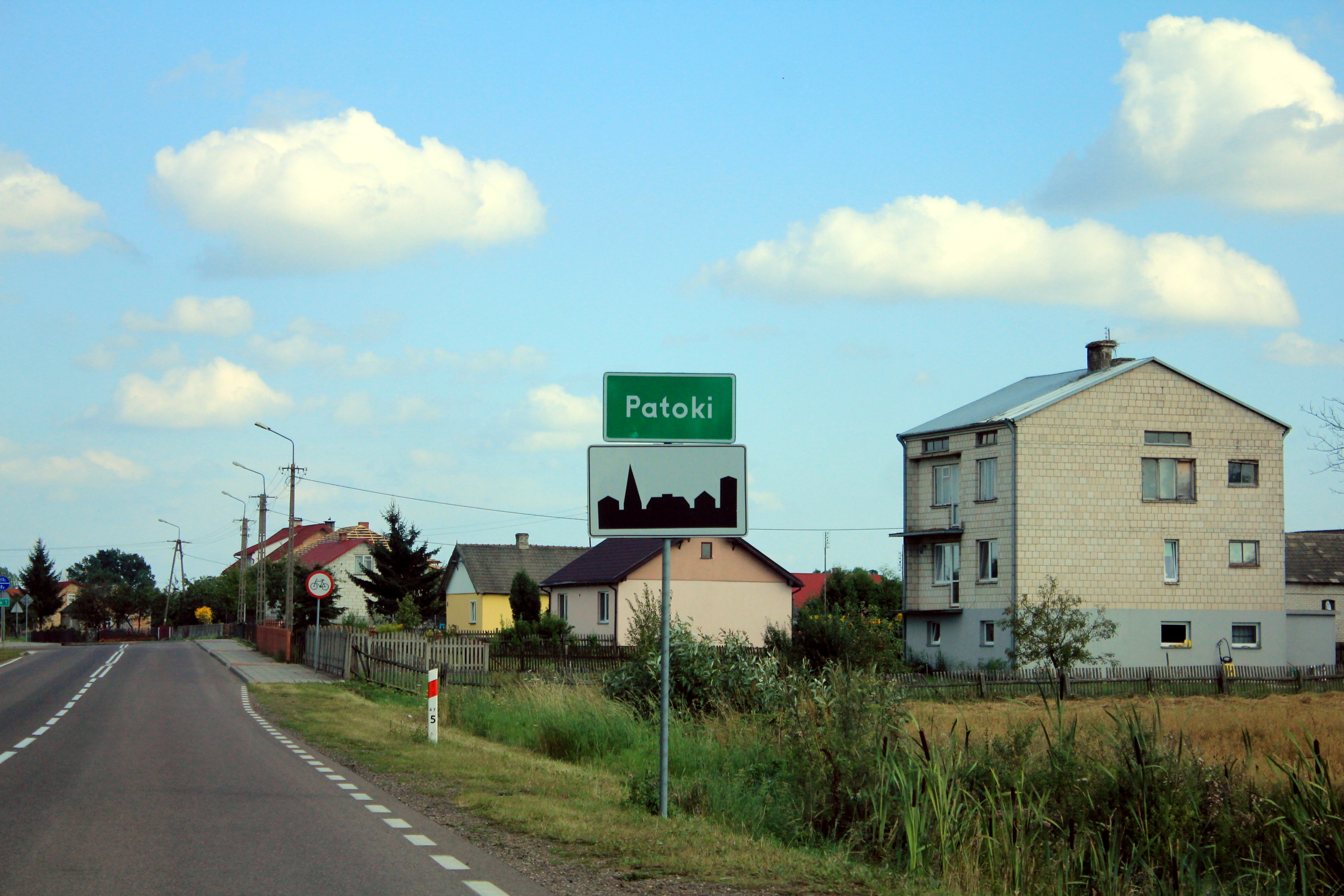

- Location within Poland
- Coordinates: 52°45′N 22°47′E
- Country: Poland
- Voivodeship: Podlaskie
- County: Bielsk
- Gmina: Brańsk

Patoki [paˈtɔki] is a village in the administrative district of Gmina Brańsk, within Bielsk County, Podlaskie Voivodeship, in north-eastern Poland.

According to the 1921 census, the village was inhabited by 308 people, among whom 292 were Roman Catholic, 8 were Orthodox, and 8 were Mosaic. At the same time, 306 inhabitants declared Polish nationality, 2 declared Belarusian nationality. There were 48 residential buildings in the village.
