= Brzeźnica, Podlaskie Voivodeship =

Brzeźnica
- Village
- Location within Poland
- Coordinates: 52°43′N 22°49′E
- Country: Poland
- Voivodeship: Podlaskie
- County: Bielsk
- Gmina: Brańsk

Brzeźnica [bʐɛʑˈɲit͡sa] is a village in the administrative district of Gmina Brańsk, within Bielsk County, Podlaskie Voivodeship, in north-eastern Poland.
