= Bronka =

- Village
- Location within Poland
- Coordinates: 52°45′N 22°56′E
- Country: Poland
- Voivodeship: Podlaskie
- County: Bielsk
- Gmina: Brańsk

Bronka [ˈbrɔŋka] is a village in the administrative district of Gmina Brańsk, within Bielsk County, Podlaskie Voivodeship, in north-eastern Poland.

According to the 1921 census, the village was inhabited by 234 people, among whom 228 were Roman Catholic, and 6 were Mosaic. At the same time, 228 inhabitants declared Polish nationality and 6 declared Jewish nationality. There were 41 residential buildings in the village at the time.
