= Glinnik, Podlaskie Voivodeship =

Glinnik
- Village
- Location within Poland
- Coordinates: 52°48′22″N 22°48′5″E
- Country: Poland
- Voivodeship: Podlaskie
- County: Bielsk
- Gmina: Brańsk
- Population: 220

Glinnik [ˈɡlinnik] is a village in the administrative district of Gmina Brańsk, within Bielsk County, Podlaskie Voivodeship, in north-eastern Poland.

In 2005 the village had a population of 220 people.
