= Konotopa, Podlaskie Voivodeship =

Konotopa
- Settlement
- Location within Poland
- Coordinates: 52°40′36″N 22°54′20″E
- Country: Poland
- Voivodeship: Podlaskie
- County: Bielsk
- Gmina: Brańsk

Konotopa [kɔnɔˈtɔpa] is a settlement in the administrative district of Gmina Brańsk, within Bielsk County, Podlaskie Voivodeship, in north-eastern Poland.
