= Otapy =

- Village
- Location within Poland
- Coordinates: 52°43′50″N 22°53′30″E
- Country: Poland
- Voivodeship: Podlaskie
- County: Bielsk
- Gmina: Brańsk

Otapy [ɔˈtapɨ] is a village in the administrative district of Gmina Brańsk, within Bielsk County, Podlaskie Voivodeship, in north-eastern Poland.

According to the 1921 census, the village was inhabited by 3 people Mosaic, declared Polish nationality. There were 1 residential buildings in the village.
