= Roszki-Wodźki =

- Village
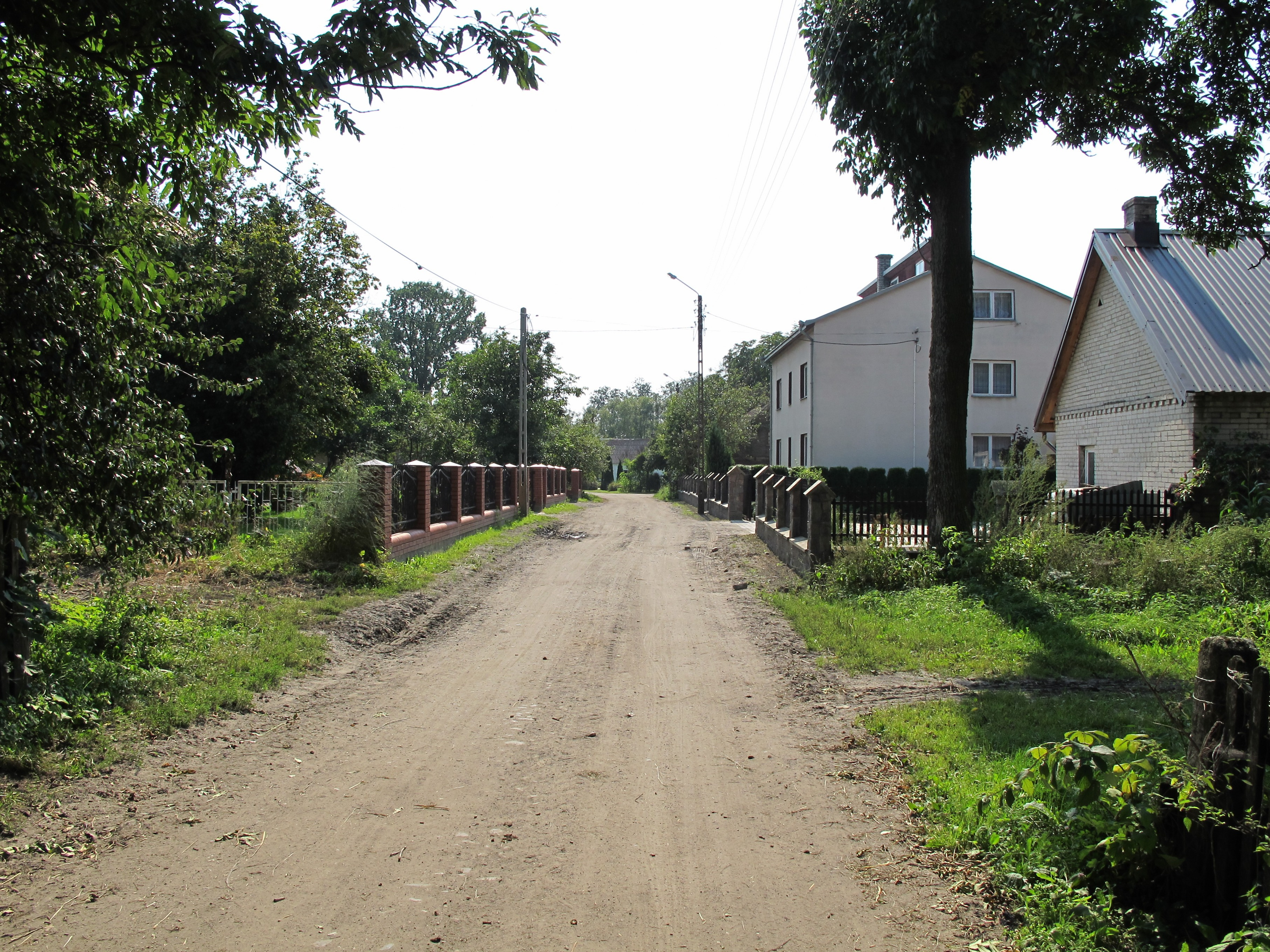
- Road in Roszki-Wodźki

- Location within Poland
- Coordinates: 53°01′01.12″N 22°47′10.64″E
- Country: Poland
- Voivodeship: Podlaskie
- County: Białystok
- Gmina: Łapy

Roszki-Wodźki [ˈrɔʂki ˈvɔt͡ɕki] is a village in the administrative district of Gmina Łapy, within Białystok County, Podlaskie Voivodeship, in north-eastern Poland.
