= Nurzec =

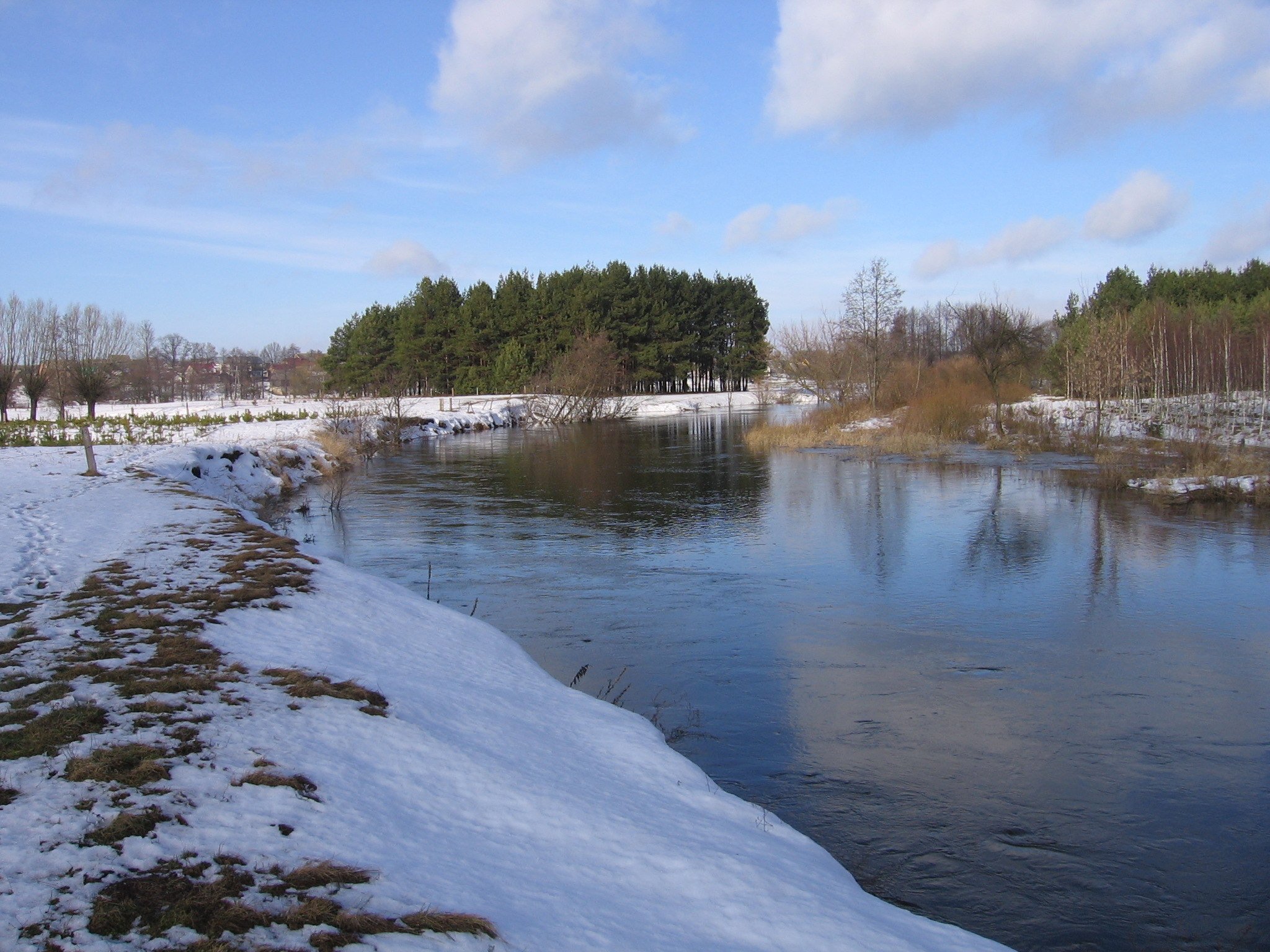

Location
- Country: Poland

Physical characteristics
- Source
  - location: Poland
  - elevation: 180 m (590 ft)
- Mouth
  - location: near Wojtkowice Stare on the Bug River
  - coordinates: 52°36′36″N 22°24′33″E
- Length: 100.2 km (62.3 mi)
- Basin size: 2,102 km^{2} (812 sq mi)

Basin features
- Progression: Bug→ Narew→ Vistula→ Baltic Sea

The Nurzec [ˈnuʐɛt͡s] is a river in north-eastern Poland, a tributary of the Bug River. It flows through the Wysoczyzny Podlasko-Bialoruskie (the plateau of Podlaskie and Belarus) region. Administratively, it lies within Podlaskie Voivodeship and Masovian Voivodeship.
