= Khodorkiv =

Village in Zhytomyr Oblast, Popilnia settlement hromada

Khodorkiv Ходорків (Ukrainian)
- Village
- Interactive map of Khodorkiv
- Location in Zhytomyr Oblast Location in Ukraine
- Coordinates: 50°5′50″N 29°18′29″E
- Country: Ukraine
- Oblast: Zhytomyr Oblast
- Raion: Zhytomyr Raion
- Hromada: Popilnia settlement hromada
- Elevation: 212 m (696 ft)

Population (2001)
  - Total: 1,371
- Postal code: 13520
- Area code: +380 4137

Khodorkiv (Ukrainian: Ходорків) is a village (population 1,371; 0.7037 km²) in Zhytomyr Oblast, in Zhytomyr Raion, located on the Irpin River.

Founded in 1471, it is the former seat of the Khodorkiv municipality in Skvyra County in the Kiev Governorate. At the end of the 19th century, a suburb of the town was called Pustelniki.

In 1941, during the Nazi occupation,the Germans established a Jewish ghetto in the forest for the town's Jewish residents. About 200 people were confined there. On 15 October 1941, the Germans liquidated the ghetto and murdered the Jews on the premises of the Widrodzhennia kolkhoz.

== Name ==
According to I. Zhelezniak, the name **Khodorkiv** clearly has an anthroponymic origin — *Khodor* is the folk form of the names Fedir, Feodor, or Theodor. It is possible that the first owner or settler of Khodorkiv was named Fedir, and the settlement took its name from him.

== Castle and manor ==
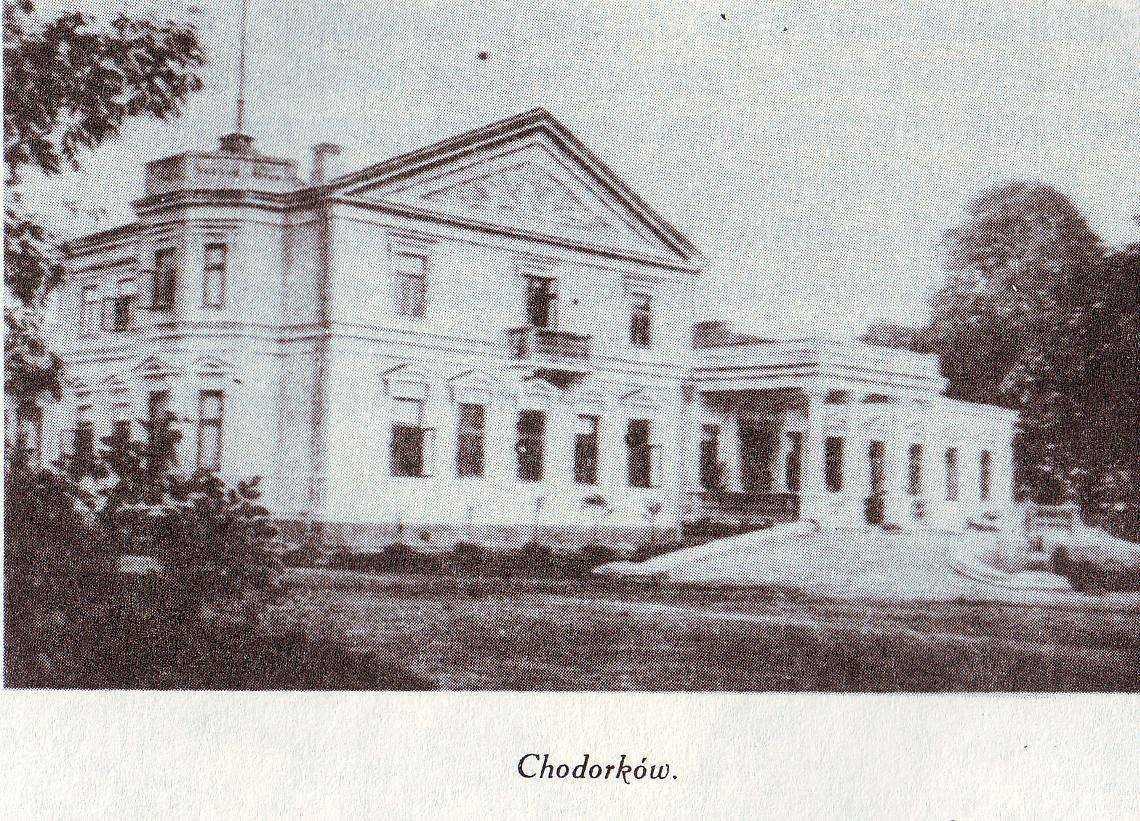

- A castle built by the Tyshas family
- A Manor house in Khodorkiv built in the Stanisławów style, with a front avant-corps supported by four Ionic columns. The main part is two stories high and topped with a triangular pediment; in the mid-19th century, it belonged to Konstanty Świdziński, who stored his art collection there. At that time, Khodorkiv was part of Skvyra County in the Kiev Governorate.,

== History ==
=== Ancient times ===
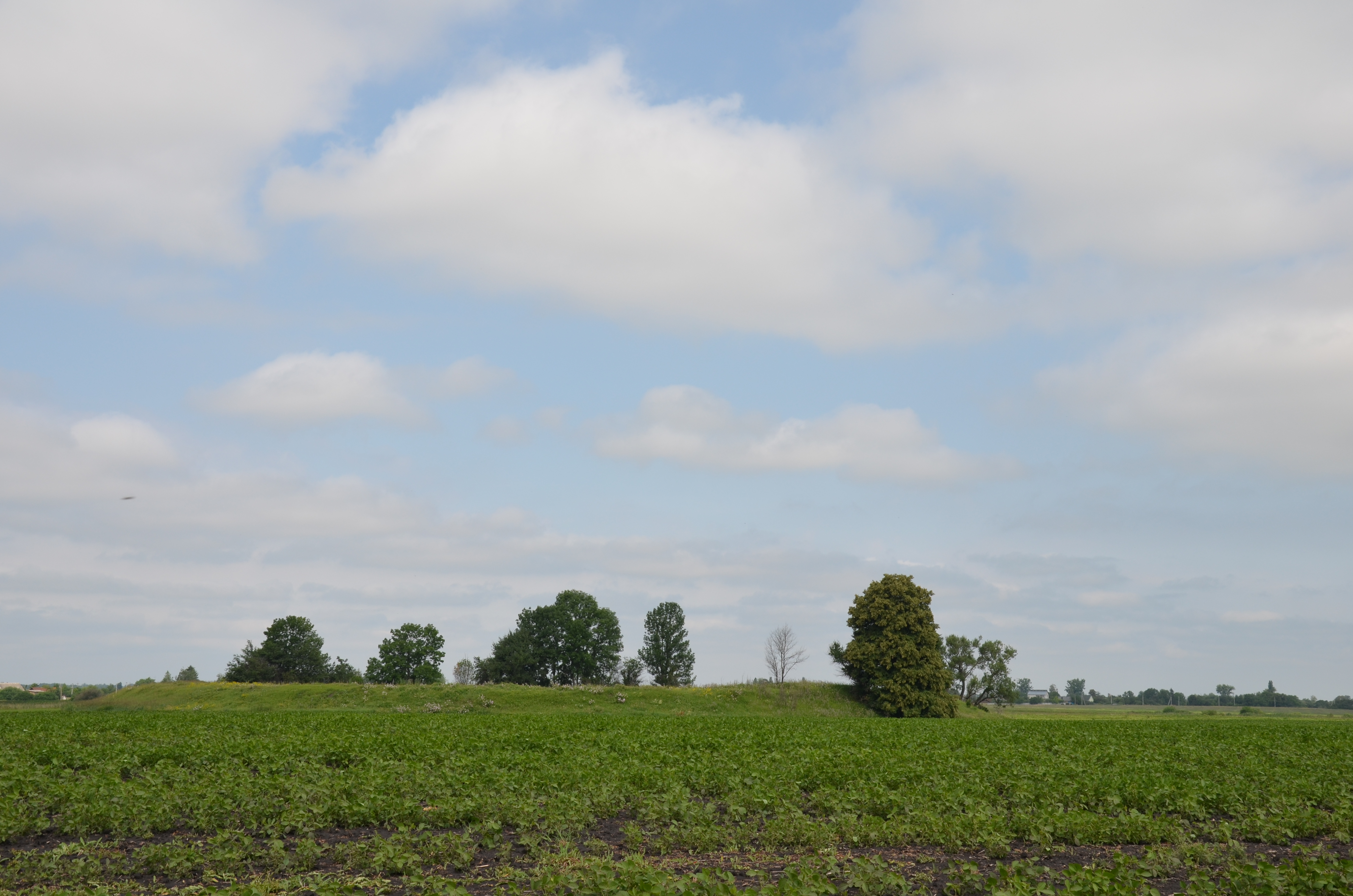
Remains of a settlement south of Khodorkiv

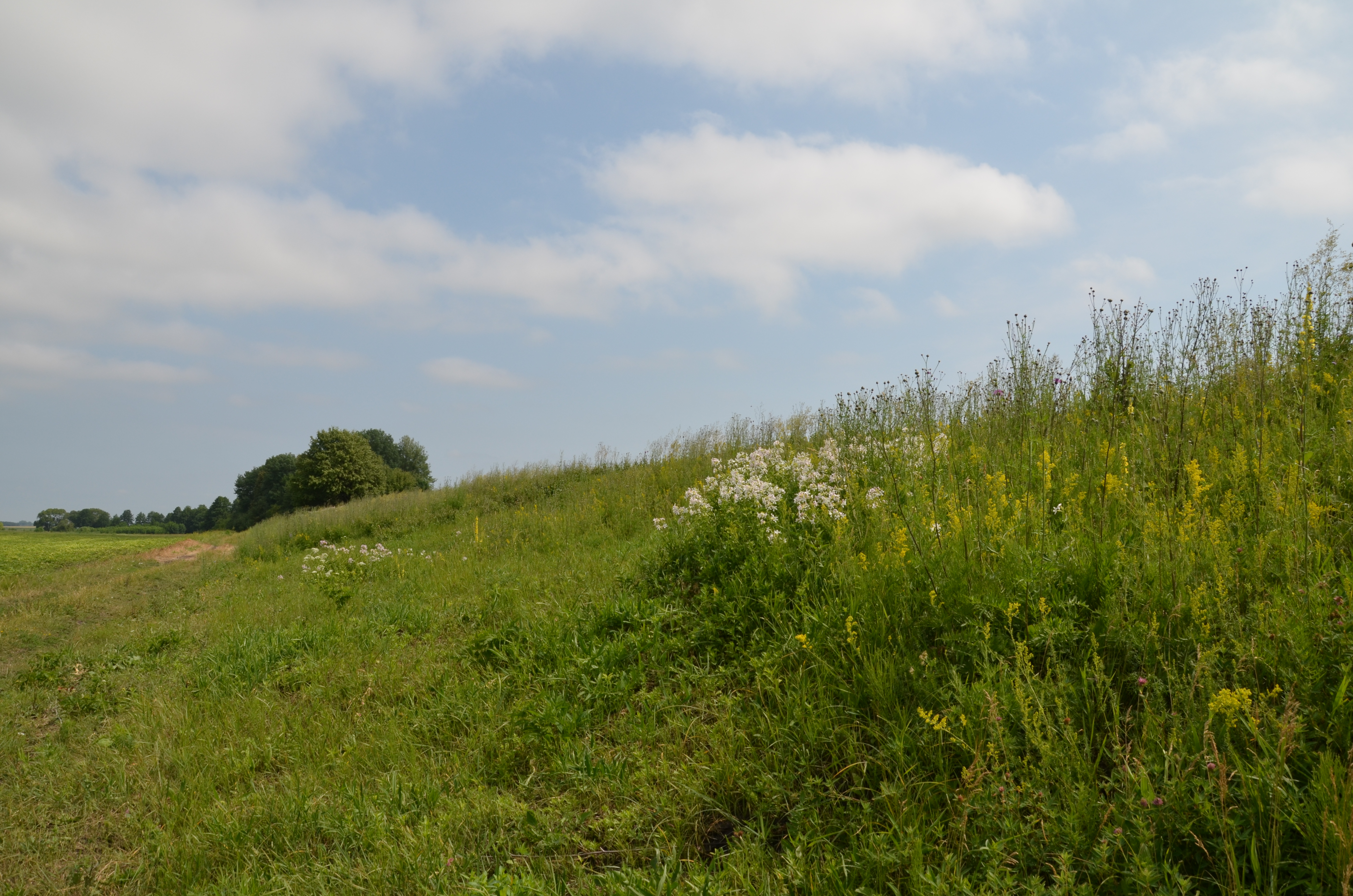
Remains of the Serpent's Wall near Khodorkiv

The initial settlement of the area where Khodorkiv is located dates back to ancient times. A settlement from the 10th–12th centuries was discovered. Archaeological expeditions between 1984 and 1988 uncovered interesting ancient relics in and around Khodorkiv. For example, 2 km southeast of the village, in a field 100 m east of the Khodorkiv–Kotliarka road, two kurgans were discovered, with a height of 1–2 m and a diameter of 22–35m. About 500 m southwest of Khodorkiv, on the left bank of the Irpin River, M. P. Kuchera discovered and studied remains of the Serpent's Walls dating from the 10th–11th centuries.

These places seem to have held exceptional significance in ancient times, as evidenced by the vast number of burial mounds in the vicinity. Especially notable is the area of Hrubsk, where researchers counted 684 mounds there. In Hrubsk, in addition to numerous mounds, there are 4 ramparts with moats, which are fairly well preserved. One of them, 6 to 7 sazhen high, forms a circle enclosing an area of up to 300 square sazhen, creating a kind of citadel. It has a moat nearby, with a single entrance leading inside. Local residents claim that during the first Tatar invasion of Kyiv, about 40,000 people from the surrounding areas fortified themselves in this location, but all were killed after a short siege. Supposedly confirming this legend, coins contemporary with the Tatar invasions were found in Hrubsk, including a broad silver groschen minted in Prague, depicting the Bohemian king Wenceslaus I of Bohemia, who reigned from 1230 to 1253.

=== Lithuanian period ===
After the victory of Lithuanian Prince Algirdas over the Tatars in the Battle of Blue Waters in 1362, during the second half of the 14th century, the lands of the Principality of Kyiv, to which Khodorkiv belonged, voluntarily became part of the Grand Duchy of Lithuania.

The exact time of Khodorkiv's founding is unknown. Mykhailo Hrushevsky cites a document he used: "The well-known description of Kyiv region, compiled after the death of Semen Olelkowicz, before the Tatar devastations, sheds interesting light on the organization of this military-settler colonization and on the local economy. The fragment begins with the village of Terpsiyiv on the Ros (later unknown). Then we have the village of Antoniv near the Ros (by the Berezianka), several villages along the Rostavytsia river and others, whose locations we cannot determine precisely (there are seven of them) — the historian notes – all show signs of practices from the time of Vytautas. This suggests we are dealing with old settlements, not new, and perhaps even older than the times of Vytautas (1392–1430)".

The settlements of Khodorkiv, Kryve, and Sokilcha had long given three barrels of honey to one of the Kyiv monasteries, but "had lain desolate since ancient times." Most likely, they were destroyed by the Tatars and, as "deserted settlements," became property of the Kyiv Castle.

Khodorkiv is first mentioned in historical records in 1471. The "Lustration of the Kyiv Land" mentions the village of Khodorkovo, where there were seven men, and the eighth was the ataman. The hearth tax was paid under Prince Vytautas. In the 1470s, after another Tatar raid, only seven men remained in Khodorkiv serving in the castle, and the eighth was their commander – the ataman.

Between 1505 and 1507, Khodorkiv suffered devastating raids by the Crimean Tatars. Folk legends recount heroic resistance by the locals. According to these, during a battle in 1527, a garrison of 2,500 registered Cossacks repelled an attack by a 43,000-strong Tatar army. Earthen fortifications preserved to this day testify to this. The 1545 lustration of Kryve, Khodorkiv, and Sokilcha states that they "have lain deserted for many years".

In 1553, Fryderyk (Friedrich) Hlibovych, Prince of Pronsk, the Chornobyl steward, granted the two "deserted settlements" of Khodorkiv and Kryve, as well as lands along the rivers Irpin and Vilia (Dubovets) in Kyiv County of the Kyiv Voivodeship, to Teodor (Fedir) Tysha, a Kyiv boyar who carried out frontier economic service. King Sigismund II Augustus on 19 December 1554, in Vilnius issued a special privilege confirming the grant. The privilege stated that "two settlements are granted to him, his wife, and descendants in hereditary possession for his merits in Kyiv and Ukraine, under the condition that they always perform economic and military service at the level of other nobles of the Grand Duchy of Lithuania".

Some rights to these lands may have also belonged to the Obdul-Pochapytsky family, who in 1598 and 1600 claimed that the Tyshas had taken the "Vilia district" (from the Vilia River) and established Khodorkiv and the village of Lypky on its lands – in the Vilia lands of Velnyn (Vilnya), Zvyzden (Zdvysk – possibly the village of Zdvizhka), and others. Additionally, the Metropolitans of Kyiv had claims against the Tyshas for founding Khodorkiv and the village of Kryve on their lands.

Teodor Tysha became the founder of the Tysha-Bykovsky family in Khodorkiv. From that time, the Tysha family expanded and spread in the area. Their family estates included Kryve, Skochysche, Bykiv, and other settlements clustered around Khodorkiv. At that time, the town was divided into Old and New Town. The Tyshas built a wooden fortified castle here, since although Khodorkiv was located off the Black Path, it and nearby villages still suffered from Tatar raids from time to time. There were two churches: one in the Old Town, and another in the New. The first had a brick-built family crypt of the Tyshas.

Soon, Khodorkiv gained the status of a miasteczko. It developed quite rapidly, as the so-called Volyn (or Kotelnia) route passed through Zhytomyr, Kotelna, Khodorkiv, and Fastiv towards Kyiv (and further to the Left Bank), along which communication and trade took place.

=== Khodorkiv under the Polish–Lithuanian Commonwealth ===
After the Union of Lublin in 1569, Khodorkiv became part of the Polish–Lithuanian Commonwealth.

In the mid-16th century, the peasantry of Right-bank Ukraine migrated to the free lands of Left-bank Ukraine in search of freedom from oppression by landlords, based on the principle of "zaymanka" (self-initiated land settlement). The Polish researcher of the late 19th century, A. Jabłonowski, referring to the records of the Lublin Tribunal, which dealt with cases concerning runaway peasants, provides the geography of the places from which resettlement occurred. Thus, fugitives from Khodorkiv headed towards Bobrovytsia, Bykiv, and Basan. In the second half of the 16th century, Cossacks, runaway peasants, and craftsmen from Khodorkiv, Rzhyshchiv, Dyvyn, and other towns and villages of Right-bank Ukraine rebuilt Baryshivka.

In 1581, Khodorkiv appears as a small town under the ownership of the Tysha-Bykovsky family, which contributed 2.5 florins in chopove tax. According to tax book No. 32 "On the register of collection of taxes from the Kyiv land", the owner of Khodorkiv in that year is listed as Pan Oleksandr Tysha.

The residents of the Khodorkiv region actively joined the ranks of the Cossacks. Thus, in 1584, a Khodorkiv noble-sich member Hryhorii Stepanovych Dublianskyi is mentioned. Khodorkiv residents also took part in the Cossack-peasant uprisings of the late 16th century under the leadership of Krzysztof Kosiński and Severyn Nalyvaiko. The Khodorkiv region itself often became a theater of military operations. In 1596, the town is mentioned in a letter from the Field Crown Hetman Stanisław Żółkiewski to the Grand Crown Hetman Jan Zamoyski during the former's stay in the town, when they were fighting against Cossack-peasant detachments led by Matvii Shaula and Severyn Nalyvaiko.

In 1606, the town of Khodorkiv is mentioned in connection with the escape of subjects of Oleksandr Tysha-Bykovskyi from the town of Khodorkiv and the village of Kryve to the estate of the Kraków castellan Prince Janusz Ostrogski in the town of Koshiv of Bratslav County and to the estate of Prince Janusz Zbaraski in the town of Pohrebyshche in Vinnytsia County.

Residents of Khodorkiv participated in the Cossack-peasant uprising of 1618, which spread across Kyivshchyna and Volhynia. The rebellious peasants destroyed noble estates, dealt with hated noblemen, declared themselves free Cossacks, and joined Cossack detachments. In the territory of the Bila Tserkva Regiment, the uprising was led by the Pavoloch sotnyk Hrytsko Krasnopirka, the Pavoloch osaul Fedir, and a certain otaman from Stara Kotelnya. The uprising spread rapidly and by mid-summer had reached the towns of Fastiv, Kodnia, Lishchyn, Kotelnya, Pavoloch, Khodorkiv, Brusyliv, Korostyshiv, and Radomyshl. By July, the insurgent detachment numbered 2,000 men.

Historical documents preserved a complaint by nobleman Petro Strybyl from the village of Studenytsia, dated 1618, against residents of Pavoloch, Verkhovnia, Khodorkiv, Kornyn and other towns and villages. They had gathered a detachment of 2,000 men, attacked his estate, burned it down, looted the peasants, and spared his "own house only for ransom." They systematically attacked the estates of other local nobles. The movement, as evidenced by the list of settlements, covered a significant area. The rebels were apparently connected with the Cossacks, as the complainant refers to several participants in the pogroms as colonels and sotnyks. The outcome of this uprising is unknown; the complaint only describes the damage inflicted on noble estates: “...assaulting violently the estates and noble houses like a foreign enemy, storming them, burning them to the ground, attacking various people along the roads, breaking into storehouses, looting estates, taking cattle and horses, and sending them to their own homes…”.

There is information that in 1618 Vasyl Mirovytskyi, who was the steward of the estate of Teodor Tysha-Bykovskyi in the village of Kryve, refused to report on the management of the estate, fled, and became the leader of one of the Cossack-peasant bands. That same year, Mirovytskyi attacked Khodorkiv and looted its owners and residents for 10,000 zlotys. Also, in 1618, the town of Khodorkiv was mentioned in the testimonies of the general court messenger of the Kyiv Voivodeship, Volhynian, and Bratslav Voivodeship, regarding the delivery of a summons from the main Lublin Tribunal to Vasyl Tysha-Bykovskyi about the return of peasants who had fled to Khodorkiv from the estate of the heirs of Bratslav castellan Mykola Semashko.

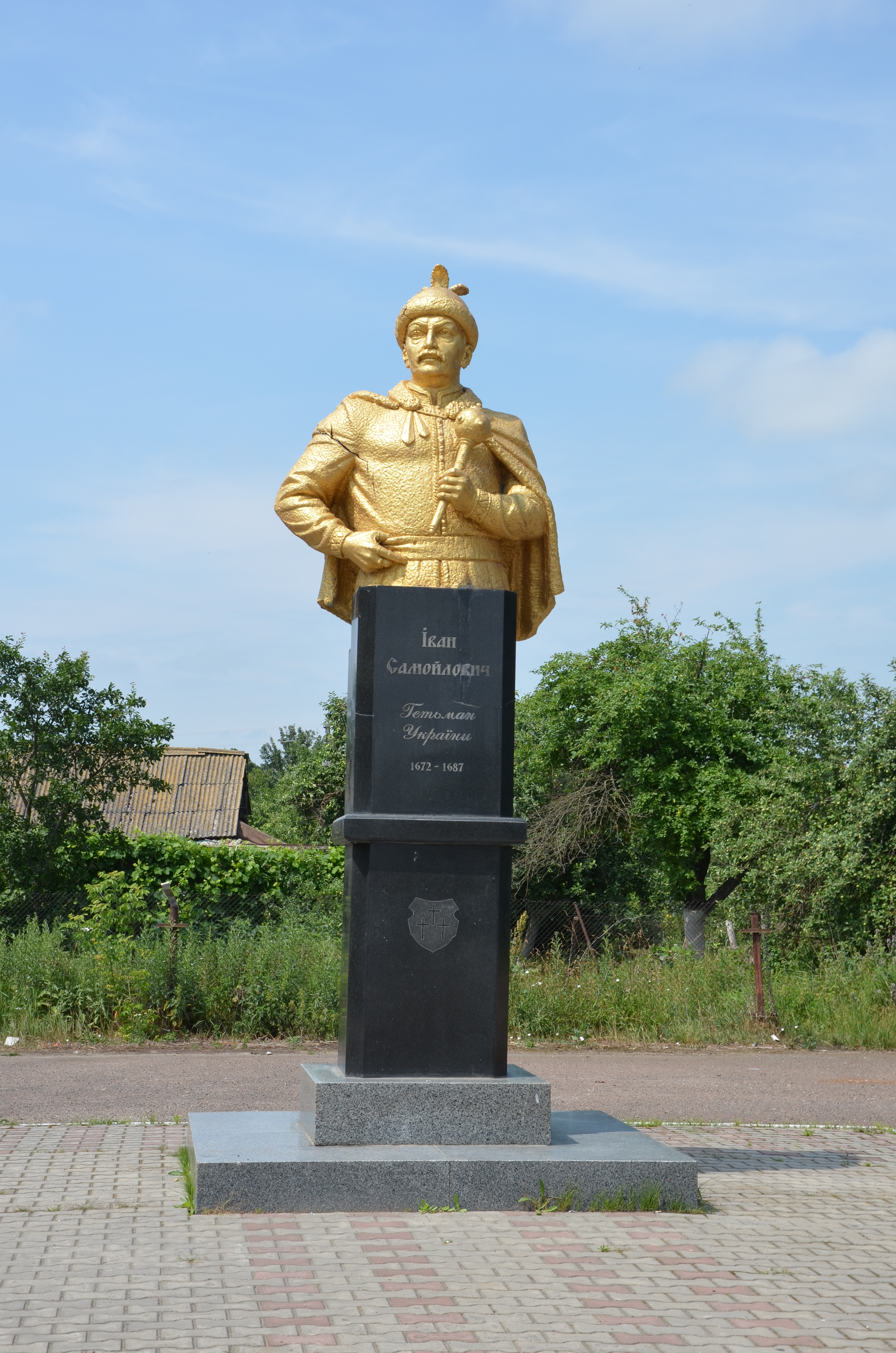
Monument to Hetman Ivan Samoilovych, Khodorkiv

Khodorkiv suffered greatly due to the internecine struggle among the nobility. The Tysha family grew significantly, and its numerous members constantly sued and quarreled among themselves for the right to possess the Khodorkiv estates. The disputes often led to armed clashes, during which noble bands repeatedly (in 1588, 1606, 1618, 1635) attacked the townspeople and residents of nearby villages, killing and robbing them. These conflicts are documented not only in court records but also by the Polish chronicler Joachim Jerlicz, author of the Chronicle or Notes of Various Events, whose sister Tetyana was married to Yeremiya Tysha, an heir of Khodorkiv.

A well-known Polish chronicler lived in Khodorkiv on the estate of his son-in-law — Yarema (Yeremiya) Tysha-Bykovskyi from 1630 to 1647 with his wife Maryana. The couple had 9 children, at least Katarzyna ( 9 November 1630), Konstantyn ( 9 December 1636), and Vasyl ( 30 January 1641) were born in Khodorkiv, and Maryana ( 30 January 1644) was born in Bykiv near Khodorkiv. Their son Konstantyn died shortly after birth (23 February 1637), and was buried in the Orthodox Church of the Immaculate Virgin in Old Town Khodorkiv, presumably in the family crypt of the Tysha-Bykovsky family. Eventually, Adam Tysha, the son of Yeremiya, expelled J. Yerlich and his family from the estate in the village of Bykiv in 1647.

In 1639, Yeremiya, Gabriel, Jan, and Pavlo Tysha removed their brother Teodor from co-ownership of the Khodorkiv estate, arguing that he was the illegitimate son of Vasyl Tysha-Bykovskyi. In connection with this dispute, the Polish king Władysław IV summoned the Tysha-Bykovskyi brothers to the Sejm court on charges of giving false testimony about Teodor.

The most brutal of all co-owners was Jan Tysha, who had long-standing conflicts with both his brothers and neighbors. He was evidently even banished due to his belligerent activities. Eventually, he met a tragic end. In neighboring Romanivka, lived Samuel Łaszcz, a crown guard, known as a "banished man (outlaw under a ban order) and troublemaker." “He maintained around him an entire armed retinue, consisting mainly of sons from impoverished families of Bratslavshchyna, whose properties and estates had been destroyed by the Tatars. Liasz assisted them by arranging marriages with noblewomen in wealthy Kyivshchyna. For one of them, he found a rich landowner near Khodorkiv. However, Jan Tysha, either for personal reasons or simply to spite the guard nobleman, upon learning of this, got ahead in the courtship and took the noblewoman. Liasz gathered his men and attacked Tysha’s estate in Khodorkiv at night, killed his offender, and took the wealthy heiress. The slain Tysha was buried in a separate grave in the corner of the monastery of the Capuchins, and not in a cemetery, as was customary for a criminal under ban".

Approximately in the 1630–40s, in Khodorkiv, in the family of local priest Samiylo and Mariya Ivanivna (née Holub), a son Ivan was born — the future Hetman of Left-bank Ukraine Ivan Samoylovych. It is known that in the 1650s, the family, along with Ivan, had to relocate to the Left Bank and settled in the town of Krasnyi Koliadyn in the Pryluky region, where Samiylo again became a priest. The father's activity later led to the nickname "Popovych" ("priest’s son"). A remarkable individual and outstanding political figure, who remained the hetman of Left-bank Ukraine for 15 years during the Ruin era, his controversial activities, viewed from today's perspective, ended in exile and death in Tobolsk.

==== Khodorkiv during the Khmelnytsky Uprising (1648–1657) ====
After the beginning of the uprising led by B. Khmelnytsky, the owners of Khodorkiv, the Tysha-Bykovsky family, fled their estate to Volhynia. During the Khmelnytsky uprising, the people of Khodorkiv rose up again against the nobility, forming the Khodorkiv company, which operated alternately as part of the Pavoloch Regiment and the Bila Tserkva Regiment. According to the 1649 register, 48 Cossacks from Khodorkiv were listed in the Bila Tserkva Regiment, including 4 ennobled nobles who became Cossacks – Ivan Bulkivskyi, Kyryk Kanivets, Konon Moliavka, and Maksym Sadovskyi. The captains of Khodorkiv at that time were Havrylo Prysovych and Vasyl Petrovskyi.

In the 1649 register, a Cossack from the Kamianobridska Sotnia of the Bila Tserkva Regiment under Ivan Popovych (Popovych-Khodorkivsky) was mentioned for the first time. According to some sources, he was born in Khodorkiv into a priest's family. It is also possible that Popovych, after serving in the Kamianobridska Sotnia, held a senior officer position in the Khodorkiv Sotnia during the time of B. Khmelnytsky, before being appointed colonel of the Pavoloch regiment, which was a customary step before becoming a colonel. I. Popovych served as a Bila Tserkva colonel (1649), Kamianobrid sotnyk (1654), Pavoloch colonel (1660–1663), and was the leader of the Cossack uprising of the Pavoloch Regiment against Hetman P. Teteria in 1663.

During continuous military actions, the Khodorkiv region suffered severe destruction and depopulation. A 1650 report from Khodorkiv's administrator, Habrieł Tysha-Bykovsky, states: "The suburbs and a large part of Khodorkiv are devastated… no more than 50 registered Cossacks remain, the rest have all dispersed". Not only Khodorkiv, but also 15 nearby villages were left deserted. All the inhabitants of those villages fled across the Dnieper.

A letter from an unknown author from the Crown Army camp dated 30 July 1651 reports: "They say that two Tysha brothers, landowners, were captured alive by their peasants with Cossacks, who came with two hundred horsemen; the servants were killed, and those who resisted were burned with their homes—this took place in Khodorkiv. Afterwards, the peasants moved out in a camp. In villages and elsewhere, peasants are moving in groups, waiting for larger gatherings of peasants, and peasantry is everywhere".

The Polish-language panegyric to Petro Mohyla titled "Memory of Glory…" ("Mnemosinon", Kyiv, 1633) was written by Heorhii, Ioann, and Adam Tysha-Bykovsky, who were among the first students (spudei) of the united Kyiv-Mohyla Collegium (1632). These brothers fought on the Polish side during the National Liberation War of the Ukrainian People, and Adam was captured by Ukrainian rebels in Khodorkiv (it is likely he is the one mentioned in the above letter). It is also possible that they were related to Mykhailo Tysha, Zviahel colonel of the insurgents (1648–1651), who switched sides to the Polish–Lithuanian Commonwealth in 1651.

In 1653, an armed clash between Cossacks and Polish nobility forces took place near Khodorkiv.

==== Khodorkiv during the Ruin ====
In 1663, the Khodorkiv sotnyk Vasyl Petrovskyi served as the Colonel of the Pavoloch Regiment.

In 1666, a conflict over the ownership of Khodorkiv was recorded—this time between Yeremiy, Habrieł, and Mykhailo Tysha-Bykovsky on one side, and Yukhym, Mykhailo, and Oleksandr Yelts (possibly Yerlich) on the other. According to a document dated 18 May 1666, the Polish king Jan Kazimierz postponed the case until all the circumstances could be clarified.

Under the Truce of Andrusovo of 1667, the town, like the rest of Right-bank Ukraine (excluding Kyiv), remained under the control of the Polish–Lithuanian Commonwealth. During the continuous wars, the Khodorkiv region, like other surrounding lands, was severely devastated, with the town and nearby villages turning into a wasteland. The remaining population emigrated en masse to the Left-bank Ukraine, especially during the hetmancy of Khodorkiv native I. Samoylovych—as a result of the forced resettlement of the Right-bank Ukraine population, the so-called "Great Retreat" of 1678–1679.

From 1686 to 1704, the Khodorkiv region was within the sphere of influence of the Fastiv Regiment under the colonel Semen Paliy, in the area known as "Paliyshchyna". During this time, some settlements were partially revived, and certain Cossack traditions, including the hundred and regimental system, were restored.

==== Khodorkiv in the 18th century ====
After the arrest of S. Paliy and the suppression of the Cossack-peasant uprising he led in 1704, the Khodorkiv region briefly came under the control of the Hetmanate of I. Mazepa, which had united Right-bank and Left-bank Ukraine, and thus came under the rule of the Tsardom of Russia and Tsar Peter the Great. However, as a result of Mazepa]'s shift to the protection of Swedish King Charles XII, their military fiasco at Poltava in 1709, and Peter the Great's failed Pruth Campaign against the Ottoman Empire in 1711, the Treaty of the Pruth, signed the same year, required the Tsardom of Russia to renounce claims to Right-bank Ukraine and withdraw its troops from the territory. By the order of Peter I, the Ukrainian population began to be forcibly relocated to the Left Bank. This process lasted until 1714. In 1712, the Sejm of the Polish–Lithuanian Commonwealth decided to abolish the regimental system on the Right Bank. In 1714, Moscow troops handed over Bila Tserkva to the Poles, and the remnants of the Right-Bank regiments crossed the Dnieper. The Polish–Lithuanian Commonwealth ultimately restored its authority over the Right Bank.

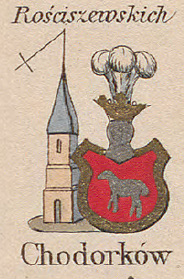
Khodorkiv on the map of Zygmunt Gertsmann

Only after these turbulent events could former landowners return to their estates. Having suffered great devastation in the past, Khodorkiv recovered slowly. As late as 1720, old Khodorkiv was a deserted area; later, a new settlement began to be built from scratch. Even in 1741, it had only 30 households.

One of Khodorkiv's co-owners, Michał Tysza, had been taken into Tatar captivity during the Cossack wars. His wife, believing him to be dead, married Stanisław Rosciszewski, who was stationed with his banner in her estate. Later, she even gave her daughter Ludwika in marriage to Rosciszewski's son. Michał returned from captivity and, devastated by his wife's betrayal, became a monk in a monastery, where he lived until his death. Khodorkiv then passed into the hands of his brother Gabriel, to whom Michał bequeathed his share. However, with Gabriel, the Tysza-Bykowski male line ended, and the entire estate passed to the Rosciszewski family.

In 1724, a wooden church dedicated to the Nativity of the Blessed Virgin Mary was built. Initially, this church was a Greek Catholic one.

In the second quarter of the 18th century, Khodorkiv and its suburbs – Pustelnyky and Skochysche – belonged to Franciszek Xawery Niitosławski, deputy voivode and grod judge of Kyiv, and his nephew Kajetan Rosciszewski, judge of Halych, master of the hunt of Brest, and grandson of Stanisław Rosciszewski. Franciszek X. Niitosławski founded a parish church and a Dominican monastery in the town in 1742, to which he granted ownership of the village of Sobolivka. It housed a miraculous icon of the Virgin Mary. This church was consecrated on 17 June 1753, by Kajetan Sołtyk, coadjutor of Kyiv, in honor of Saint Stanislaus, Bishop. A legal case involving Niitosławski was heard in 1753–1754, concerning an incident at a fair in Berdychiv. Niitosławski's wife Eleonora, together with her daughter Magdalena (wife of the Trakhtemyriv elder K. Szczeniowski), took money from Russian and Ukrainian merchants as "compensation" for a Haidamaky raid on Khodorkiv. However, no documentation confirms such a raid on the Khodorkiv estate in the 1750s.

In 1763, a second church and Capuchin monastery were established in Khodorkiv by K. Rosciszewski, and consecrated by parish priest ks. Jaworski, prior of the Dominicans, in honor of Saint Cajetan. The Dominican monastery also included a hospital and a parish school.

In 1765, 452 Jews lived in Khodorkiv.

In 1766, Khodorkiv was mentioned in the context of peasants fleeing from their owner K. Rosciszewski.

In 1768, Khodorkiv was attacked by Haidamaky, who burned down the Dominican church and killed priests Voronetsky and Kotovych. To suppress the uprising, Prince Meshchersky soon arrived with troops. The Haidamaky fled the town and fortified themselves in a nearby forest using abatises. Meshchersky failed to persuade them to lay down their arms and offered them safe passage out of the forest. However, after they left the forest, he pursued them across the fields and completely destroyed them. The burned church was rebuilt in 1779 by K. Rosciszewski.

=== Khodorkiv under the rule of the Russian Empire ===
Since 1793, after the Second Partition of the Polish–Lithuanian Commonwealth, the territory of Khodorkiv came under the control of the Russian Empire. Starting from 1797, Khodorkiv became the center of the Khodorkiv volost within the Skvira uezd of the Kiev Governorate.

=== 20th century ===
At the beginning of the 20th century, social life in Khodorkiv became more diverse. In 1904, a public library and reading room was opened in Khodorkiv. A hospital and a poorhouse for 30 people were also established, funded by a bequest from Princess Cecylia Radziwiłł, to care for elderly and lonely residents of the town and the Skvyra uyezd of the Christian faith. Residents received full support free of charge. The poorhouse operated on the interest generated from the capital donated by the founder.

At that time, the volost elder in Khodorkiv was S. Stelman, and the volost clerk was A. Neshchadym. The residents of Khodorkiv were treated by district doctor Mykola Fedorovych Davydov, and the pharmacy was managed by pharmacist Yosyp Fadeyovych Dobrochynskyi. The Khodorkiv post and telegraph office was headed by Oleksandr Mykolaiovych Radomskyi. A postal and telegraph savings bank was also opened at the office. Regular fairs were held in the town – every second Wednesday.

== Notable people ==
- Ivan Samoylovych (1630s–1690), Hetman of Left-bank Ukraine (1672–1687)
- Panteleimon Kulish (1819–1897), Ukrainian writer, folklorist and ethnographer; lived and worked in Khodorkiv
- Aron Baron (1894–?), Ukrainian Jewish anarchist revolutionary
- Nokhem Oyslender (1893-1962), Soviet Yiddish author and critic
- Anna (Hanna) Bereśniak-Gościnna (1889–1974) the mother of René Goscinny, the renowned French comics writer and co-creator of Astérix.
- Ivan Vasilyevich Rzepecki (31 December 1779 – 19 January 1829), a nobleman that served as a military medical officer in the Imperial Russian Army, father of the captain Karol Ivanovich Rzepecki. He was an ancestor of Danuta Siedzikówna, a Polish national heroine.

== Sources ==
- Chornobryvtseva, O. S., ed. (1973). "Khodorkiv". Історія міст і сіл Української РСР: У 26 т. Житомирська область [History of Cities and Villages of the Ukrainian SSR: In 26 vols. Zhytomyr Oblast] (in Ukrainian). Kyiv: The Ukrainian Soviet Encyclopedia, Academy of Sciences of the Ukrainian SSR.
- Kryvosheya, V. V. (2002). Генеалогія українського козацтва. Білоцерківський полк [Genealogy of the Ukrainian Cossacks. Bilotserkivskyi regiment] (PDF) (in Ukrainian). I.F. Kuras Institute of Political and Ethnonational Studies of the National Academy of Sciences of Ukraine, Institute of Ukrainian Archeography and Source Studies named after M.S. Hrushevsky National Academy of Sciences of Ukraine, Hetmanship Museum. Kyiv: Stylos. ISBN 966-8009-28-2.
- Makhorin, H. L.; Olenska, I. S. (2006). Край над Унавою [The Land Along the Unava] (in Ukrainian). Hennadii Makhorin, Iryna Olenska. Zhytomyr: Volyn. ISBN 966-8059-66-2.
- Pokhilevich, L. (1864). Сказания о населенных местностях Киевской губернии, или Статистические, исторические и церковные заметки о всех деревнях, селах, местечках и городах, в пределах губернии находящихся [Accounts of the Inhabited Localities of the Kyiv Governorate, or Statistical, Historical, and Ecclesiastical Notes on All the Hamlets, Villages, Townships, and Towns Situated Within the Governorate] (in Russian). Kyiv: Printing House of the Kiev-Pechersk Lavra.
