= Karol Ivanovich Rzepecki =

Officer of the Imperial Russian Army

Karl Ivanovich Rzepecki
- Карл Иванович Ржепецкий
- Born: 10 August 1816; Ratno, Volhynian Governorate, Russian Empire
- Died: 28 May 1888 (aged 71); Kaluga, Russian Empire
- Burial place: Pyatnitskoye Cemetery, Kaluga
- Spouse: Amalia Emilia Lohmann
- Children: Nikolay Bernard, Antonina Natalia, Olga Henrietta, Aleksandra Katarina, Karl Edward, Aleksander Konstantin, Eugenia Amalia, Vladimir Mikhail, Ivan Joseph, Fyodor Mikhail, Franz Konstantin
- Military career
- Allegiance: Russian Empire
- Branch: Imperial Russian Army
- Service years: 1833–1868
- Rank: Captain
- Conflicts: Crimean War
- Awards: Order of Saint Vladimir, 4th class Order of Saint Stanislaus, 3rd class 15-year Distinguished Service Badge; Bronze Medal for the Crimean War

Karl Ivanovich Rzepecki (Russian: Карл Иванович Ржепецкий; 10 August 1816 – 28 May 1888) was an officer of the Imperial Russian Army who served for more than three decades and reached the rank of captain. He was a member of the Polish-speaking Roman Catholic nobility of the Volhynian Governorate and later served in military and government institutions in the Russian Empire. He was the father of several military officers, including Karl Karlovich Rjepetski and Vladimir Rzepecki, as well as Aleksander Konstantin Rzepecki.

== Early life and education ==
Rzepecki was born on 10 August 1816 in Ratno, then in the Volhynian Governorate of the Russian Empire. According to his service record, he belonged to the nobility of the Starokostiantyniv Uyezd of the Volhynian Governorate and was a Roman Catholic. He was educated at the Kremenets Lyceum.

His parents were Ivan Rzepecki (31 December 1779, Khodorkiv – 19 January 1829, Brusyliv) and Tekla (Fekla) Kwiatkowska. Ivan Vasilyevich Rzepecki was a nobleman and served as a military medical officer in the Imperial Russian Army.

The earliest known ancestors were Aleksander Rzepecki with his son Ludwik Rzepecki, a Volhynian nobleman documented in 1700–1704 as the owner of estates in the Lutsk district. In 1704, Ludwik’s inheritance was formally recorded by Lutsk official Matvey Nawrocki (Матвей Навроцкий).

== Military career ==
Rzepecki entered military service as a private in the Jäger regiment, later designated an infantry regiment. He subsequently attained the rank of non-commissioned officer and was promoted to praporshchik. He was then transferred to the Revel Internal Garrison Battalion.

During his career he served in several administrative and military positions, including as a battalion treasurer. He subsequently received the ranks of podporuchik, poruchik, staff-captain, and finally captain.

His service record states that by February 1868 he had completed 34 years, 3 months and 26 days of active service. It also records 1 year, 1 month and 1 day spent on campaigns and in battles.

By 1868 he was serving as assistant commander of Moscow Prison Company No. 5, an institution administered by the civil authorities. His salary was recorded as 390 rubles per year at the rank of captain.

In June 1868 the Governor of Moscow petitioned for Rzepecki's retirement on grounds of illness, requesting that he be granted the next rank, the right to wear the uniform, a full pension and additional assistance because of an injury sustained in the performance of his duties. The case was handled by the Ministry of War and is preserved in the Russian State Military Historical Archive (RGVIA), fond 400, inventory 9, file 3943.

== Awards and decorations ==
A full service record compiled on 21 February 1868 lists Rzepecki as a holder of several Russian imperial decorations. These included:

- the Order of Saint Vladimir, 4th class, with bow;
- the Order of Saint Stanislaus, 3rd class;
- the 15-year Distinguished Service Badge for impeccable service;
- a bronze medal on the St. Andrew ribbon commemorating the Crimean War of 1853–1856.

== Marriage and family ==
Rzepecki married Amalia Emilia Lohmann (1822–1892), who was born in Reval. They married in Reval on 16 April 1839.

The couple had a large family. Their children included Nikolay Bernard Rzepecki (1840–1914), Antonina Natalia Rzepecka, Olga Henrietta Rzepecka (1845–1868), Aleksandra Katarina Rzepecka, Karl Edward Rzepecki, Aleksander Konstantin Rzepecki (1849–1899), Eugenia Amalia Rzepecka, Vladimir Mikhail Rzepecki (1853–1914), Ivan Joseph Rzepecki, Fyodor Mikhail Rzepecki (1860–1869), and Franz Konstantin Rzepecki.

Several of his sons entered military service. His son Vladimir Karlovich Rzepecki later attained the rank of major general in the Imperial Russian Army, while another son, Karl Karlovich Rzepecki, became a lieutenant colonel.

== Retirement and death ==
Rzepecki retired from active service in 1868 after more than 34 years of service. The retirement proceedings state that his dismissal was sought on grounds of illness and that he was to receive a pension and retain the right to wear his uniform.

He died on 28 May 1888 in Kaluga. According to the genealogical record, he was buried at Pyatnitskoye Cemetery in Kaluga on 31 May 1888.
