= Mikołaj Rzepecki =

Russian army officer

- Николай Ржепецкий
- Born: 20 August [O.S. 8 August] 1840; Reval, Governorate of Estonia, Russian Empire (now Tallinn, Estonia)
- Died: 13 April [O.S. 26 April] 1914; Warsaw, Congress Poland
- Burial place: Powązki Cemetery, Warsaw
- Spouse: Józefa Maria Wróblewska
- Children: Mikołaj, Włodzimierz
- Relatives: Vladimir Rzepecki (brother), Karol Edward Rzepecki(brother), Karol Ivanovich Rzepecki
- Military career
- Allegiance: Russian Empire
- Branch: Imperial Russian Army
- Service years: 1856–1893
- Rank: Colonel
- Unit: 38th Tobolsk Infantry Regiment
- Awards: Order of St. Vladimir 4th class with bow, 4th class Order of St. Stanislav, 2nd class Order of St. Anna 3rd class

Mikołaj Bernard Karłowicz Rzepecki (Russian: Николай Бернар Карлович Ржепецкий, romanized: Nikolai Bernar Karlovich Rzhepetskiy; 20 August 1840 – 13/26 April 1914) was a Polish-Russian military officer who served in the Imperial Russian Army. He served for more than three decades, including service with the 38th Tobolsk Infantry Regiment and later in the quartermaster administration of the Turkestan Military District. He retired from active service in 1893 with the rank of colonel.

== Early life ==
Rzepecki was born on 20 August 1840 in Reval (present-day Tallinn), then part of the Governorate of Estonia in the Russian Empire. He was a Roman Catholic and belonged to the nobility of the Estonian Governorate. His parents were Karol Rzepecki and Amalia Emilia Lohmann (Loman).

He was educated at a private educational institution before entering military service.

Rzepecki belonged to a large family whose members included several officers of the Imperial Russian Army, including his younger brothers Karol Edward Rzepecki and Vladimir Rzepecki.

== Military career ==
=== Early service ===
Rzepecki entered military service on 8 October 1856 as a non-commissioned officer in the Grenadier, later Kexholm Regiment, named after Emperor Franz Joseph of Austria. On 21 October 1856 he was promoted to the rank of podpraporshchik (подпрапорщик).

On 30 November 1858 he was promoted to praporshchik (ensign) and transferred to the 38th Tobolsk Infantry Regiment. He departed for the new regiment on 10 December 1858 and arrived on 21 January 1859.

On 4 November 1863 he was promoted to second lieutenant (подпоручик). On 20 December of the same year he was appointed acting officer responsible for the regiment's weapons.

In 1863–1864, he served with Russian forces in the Warsaw Military District.

=== Regimental service ===
On 2 March 1865 Rzepecki returned to front-line service with the regiment. He was promoted to lieutenant on 7 May 1866.

On 1 January 1868 he was appointed commander of the regiment's 2nd Company. He was promoted to staff captain on 1 June 1870 and formally confirmed as company commander on 1 September 1871. On 17 August 1872 he was promoted to captain.

On 2 July 1874 he relinquished command of his company. In November 1874 he was attached to the Ivangorod Military Hospital in preparation for an administrative post. He returned to his regiment in November 1875 and was appointed commander of the 4th Company on 7 January 1876.

In 1876 he was also appointed a member of the regimental court and the officers' society court. In May 1877 he relinquished command of his company because of illness and was subsequently placed in charge of the regiment's training detachment. Later that year he was sent as a military representative to a military-conscription presence in the Warsaw Military District.

== Service in Turkestan ==
In 1878 Rzepecki's career moved from regimental command to military administration. He was transferred to the Tashkent Quartermaster Clothing Depot as an official for special assignments, while remaining listed with the army infantry.

He was appointed an official for special assignments of the eighth class in July 1878. On 1 March 1879 he became superintendent of stores at the Tashkent Clothing Depot. On 21 January 1882 he was appointed to command the depot's lower-rank personnel.

On 30 August 1882, in recognition of "excellent diligence and zealous service", Rzepecki was promoted from captain to major. On 6 May 1884 he was redesignated as lieutenant colonel.

In September 1886 he received the Order of St. Vladimir, 4th class with bow, with the distinction commemorating 25 years of commissioned service. His other decorations included the Order of St. Stanislav, 2nd class, and the Order of St. Anna, 3rd class.

In May 1889 he was appointed acting chief superintendent of the Tashkent Clothing Depot. In 1892 he was again appointed acting chief superintendent, serving in that capacity from 30 April until 1 September 1892.

His 1893 service record lists his position as superintendent of stores of the clothing depot of the Turkestan Military District.

== Retirement ==
A special file concerning Rzepecki's retirement was opened on 5 May 1893 and closed on 26 June 1893. On 1 June 1893, by the highest imperial order, Lieutenant Colonel Rzepecki was promoted to colonel and simultaneously discharged from active service, with the right to wear his uniform and with a pension. At the time his final service record was compiled, on 13 April 1893, he had served in the Imperial Russian Army for more than thirty-six years.

Rzepecki died in Warsaw at 26 April 1914, aged 73 (13 April 1914 in the Julian calendar). Polish genealogical records give the date as 13 April 1914 in the Julian calendar. He was buried at Powązki Cemetery in Warsaw.

== Family ==
Rzepecki married Józefa Maria Wróblewska, a Roman Catholic and daughter of the nobleman Hipolit Wróblewski. The couple married in Bełchatów on 6 August 1869. Their son Mikołaj was born on 21 June 1871. Genealogical records also identify Włodzimierz Rzepecki and a daughter among his children. Rzepecki was the elder brother of several members of the Rzepecki family who served in the Imperial Russian military. His brothers included Lieutenant Colonel Karol Edward Rzepecki and Major General Vladimir Karlovich Rzepecki.

== Military ranks ==
Military ranks
| Date | Rank | Position |
|---|---|---|
| 8 October 1856 | Non-commissioned officer | |
| 21 October 1856 | Podpraporshchik | |
| 30 November 1858 | Praporshchik; transferred to the 38th Tobolsk Infantry Regiment | |
| 4 November 1863 | Second lieutenant | |
| 7 May 1866 | Lieutenant | |
| 1 June 1870 | Staff captain | |
| 17 August 1872 | Captain | |
| 30 August 1882 | Major | |
| 6 May 1884 | Lieutenant colonel | |
| 1 June 1893 | Colonel; retired from active service | |

== Decorations ==
- Order of St. Vladimir, 4th class with bow, awarded for 25 years of commissioned service
- Order of St. Stanislav, 2nd class
- Order of St. Anna, 3rd class
