= The Black Path =

The Black Path may refer to:

- The Black Path (novel), a novel by Asa Larsson
- The Black Path (album), an album by Emil Bulls
- Black Path, an ancient route between markets in London, England
