= Brusilov =

Brusilov (Russian: Брусилов) or Brusilova (feminine; Брусилова) is a Russian surname originating from the verb brusit meaning mumble. Notable people with the surname include:

- Aleksei Brusilov (1853–1926), Russian cavalry general
  - Brusilov Offensive, Russian offensive during World War I
- Georgy Brusilov (1884–c.1914), Russian naval officer and Arctic explorer
  - Brusilov Expedition in 1912–1914
  - Brusilov Nunataks in Antarctica
- Lev Brusilov (1857–1909), Russian vice admiral and brother of Aleksei

== See also ==
- Brusyliv (disambiguation), Ukrainian variant of Brusilov
- Brusilovski
