= Brusilovsky =

Brusilovsky, Brussilovsky, Brusilovskiy or Brusilovski (Ukrainian: Брусиловський, Russian: Брусиловский) is a Ukrainian masculine surname; its feminine counterpart is Brusilovskaya, Brussilovskaya or Brusilovska. It is also an adjective derived from the closely related Russian surname Brusilov. The origin of both surnames was traced to the verb брусить meaning mumble. According to other sources the immediate origin of surname Brusilovsky is the Ukrainian town Brusilov (Ukrainian: Брусилів, Russian: Брусилов).

The surname may refer to

- Alexandre Brussilovsky (born 1953), Soviet-born French violinist and conductor
- Misha Brusilovsky (1931–2016), Russian painter and graphic artist
- Peter Brusilovsky, Soviet-born American computer scientist
- Yevgeny Brusilovsky (1905–1981), Soviet and Russian composer
