= Pavoloch massacre =

Mass killing during the Holocaust

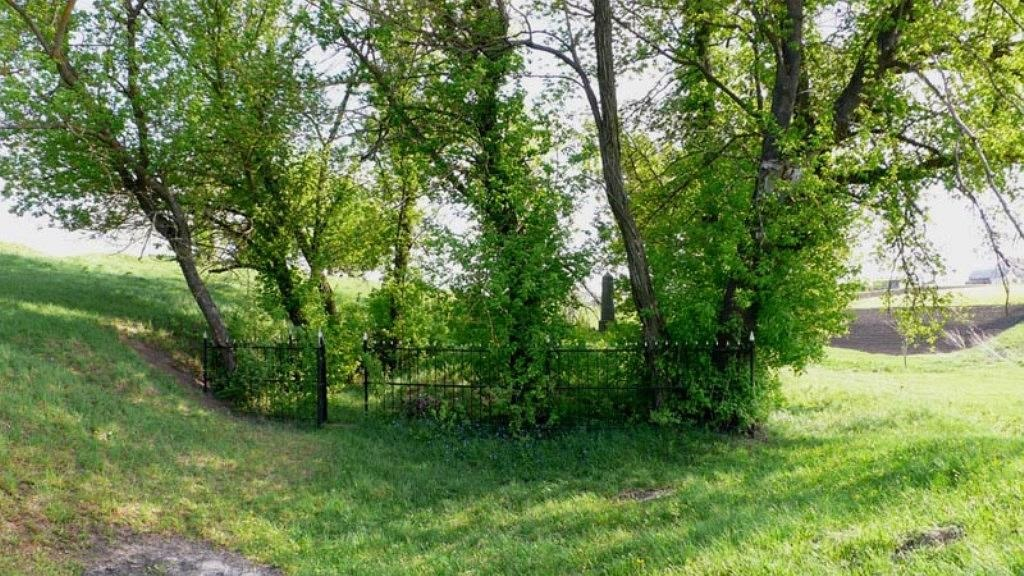
Pavoloch, Mass Grave of Jews

The Pavoloch massacre was a mass killing during the Holocaust on September 5, 1941, in which the Ukrainian shtetl of Pavoloch was depopulated of Jews by the Einsatzgruppen.

== Massacre ==
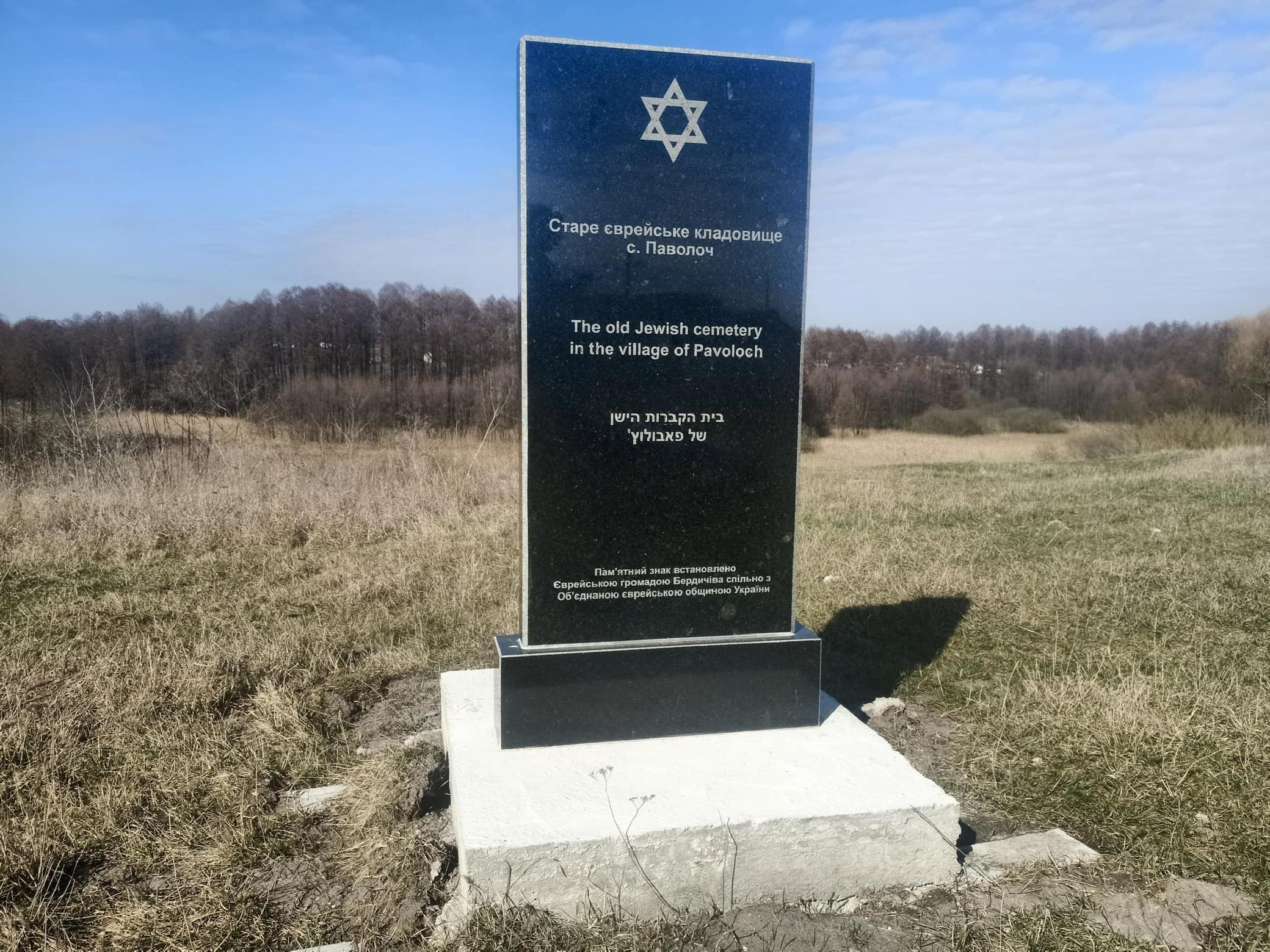
Pavoloch. Old Jewish cemetery. Memorial sign

When World War II began, the Jews of Pavoloch lived in fear of the Nazi death squads, which had killed so many of their brethren in German-occupied countries. They had heard of the terrible things that the Nazis did to the Jews. On September 5, 1941, during Operation Barbarossa, their fears were justified, when an Einsatzgruppen squad drove into the shtetl. The Nazis had orders from SS-Brigadeführer Otto Rasch to exterminate any Jews they found, and the Nazis obeyed the order to the letter. They rounded up all of the 1,500 Jews and took them to the Jewish cemetery, located outside of Pavoloch.

The Nazis forced all of the Jews to dig a mass grave and made them kneel next to the grave. The Nazis shot all 1,500 of them, and the bodies fell into the mass grave. The Einsatzgruppen, seeing that their work was done, quickly filled the pit to exterminate any evidence of the slaughter and drove away.

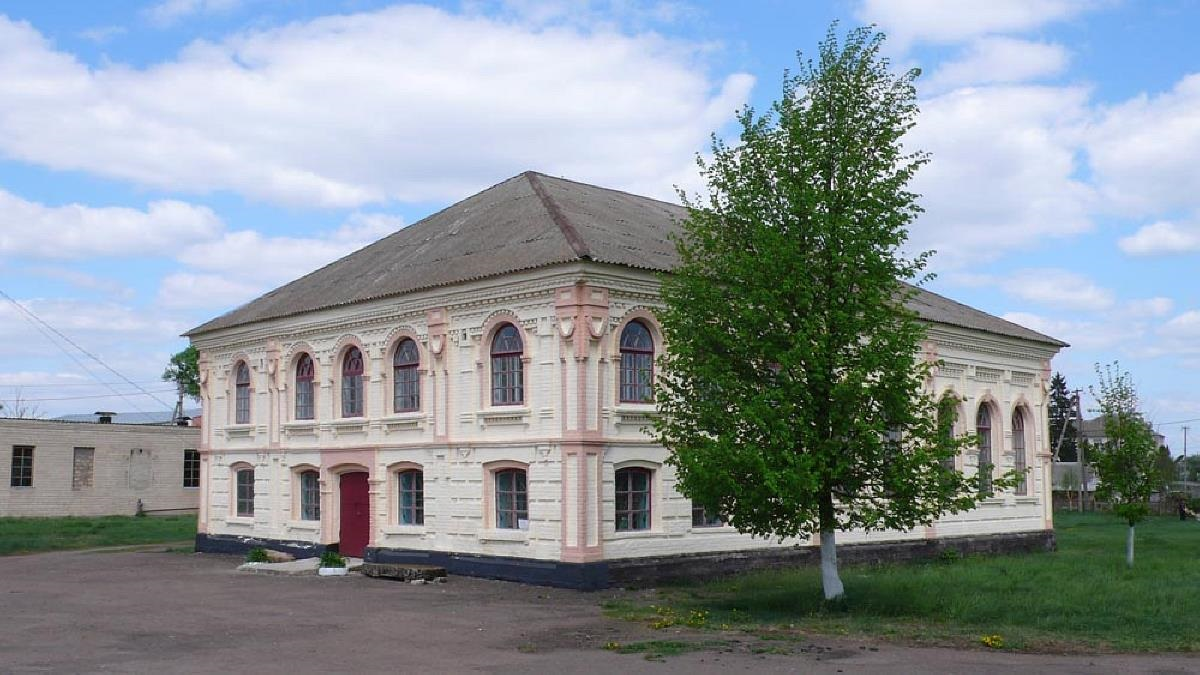
Pavoloch. Synagogue - Museum

== Memorial ==
After World War II ended, a memorial was erected in the cemetery to commemorate those that were brutally killed by the Einsatzgruppen. Also, the old synagogue, which survived the short-lived Nazi occupation, is now a museum that houses the records of those who were murdered and contains exhibits on village history.

== Sources ==
- Kuttler, Hillel (14 April 2013). "Seeking Kin: From an Anatevka-like Village to a Family Reunion in Florida". Jewish Telegraphic Agency.
- "Pavoloch". travel2ukraine.info. 6 October 2010. Archived from the original on 29 September 2015.
- "IDEA - ALM : A Memorial Assembly beside a Memorial Monument on a Mass Grave of the Jews of Pavoloch, Ukraine, Who Were Massacred on the Eve of Yom Kippur 5702 (late September 1941)". Ghetto Fighters House Archives (n.d.).
