= Kornyn, Zhytomyr Oblast =

Rural locality in Zhytomyr Oblast, Ukraine

Kornyn Корнин
- Rural settlement
- Location within Zhytomyr Oblast Location within Ukraine
- Coordinates: 50.0839°N 29.5375°E
- Country: Ukraine
- Oblast: Zhytomyr Oblast
- Raion: Zhytomyr Raion
- Time zone: UTC+2 (EET)
  - Summer (DST): UTC+3 (EEST)

Kornyn (Ukrainian: Корнин, Russian: Ко́рнин, Polish: Kornyn) is a rural settlement in Zhytomyr Raion, Zhytomyr Oblast, Ukraine. Population: 1,903 (2022 estimate)

== History ==
The settlement has been known since 1550 and was originally a fortified point of the Grand Duchy of Lithuania. After the Union of Lublin in 1569 it became a part of the Polish-Lithuanian Commonwealth.

Since 1797, the village of Kornyn was the center of the Kornynsky volost of the Skvirsky Uyezd of the Kiev Governorate. As of 1895, there were 136 courtyards with 987 inhabitants, a sugar factory, a school, two retail shops, an Orthodox Resurrection Church and a Jewish house of prayer.

During the revolution of 1905-1907, in the summer of 1905, a strike of agricultural workers took place in Kornyn.

After the outbreak of the civil war in January 1918, Soviet rule was established here, but at the end of February 1918, Kornyn was occupied by German troops, who remained here until November 1918. In June 1918, an underground communist group emerged in the settlement.

During the Soviet-Polish war on April 30, 1920, Kornyn was captured by Polish troops, but on June 11, 1920, they were knocked out by advancing units of the 1st Cavalry Army of the Red Army. After the end of hostilities, the restoration of the economy began, in 1921 the sugar factory resumed its work.

In March 1923, Kornyn became the center of the Kornynsky district.

In 1929, as a result of the unification of 56 peasant farms, an agricultural artel was created here, on the basis of which two collective farms and machine-tractor station were created in 1930.

In 1932, illiteracy was eliminated here. In 1937, the Kornynsky quarry started to work.

In 1938, Kornyn became an urban-type settlement: a secondary school, a seven-year school, a district House of Culture and two libraries were built here.

During the Great Patriotic War, on July 14, 1941, the village was occupied by German troops. Under the conditions of occupation on October 21, 1941, a Soviet underground organization emerged here. On December 25, 1943, during the Zhytomyr-Berdichesky offensive operation, Kornyn was liberated by Soviet troops of the 1st Ukrainian Front of the Red Army. The restoration of the village began.

On November 28, 1957, Kornynsky district was incorporated into Popelnyansky district of Zhytomyr oblast.

Until 26 January 2024, Kornyn was designated urban-type settlement. On this day, a new law entered into force which abolished this status, and Kornyn became a rural settlement.

== Population ==
In January 1989, the population was 2,930.

In 2001, population was 2,708.

As of January 1, 2013, the population was 2,339.
