= Karl Karlovich Rjepetski =

Russian military officer (1847–1894)

Podpolkovnik Karl Karlovich Rjepetsky
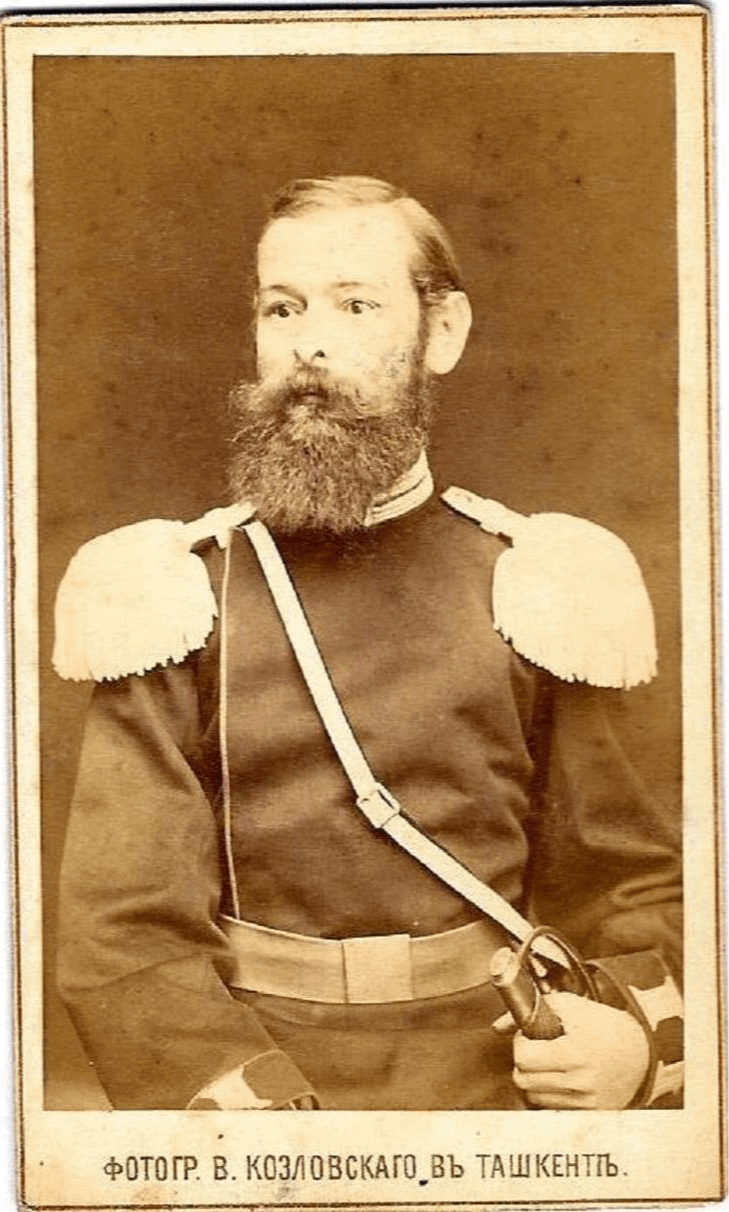

Personal details
- Born: Karol Edward Karlovich Rzepecki; 10 August 1847 Reval, Governorate of Estonia, Russian Empire
- Died: 12 November 1894 (aged 47) Ardahan, Ottoman Empire
- Spouse: Helena Kamieńska
- Relations: Vladimir Rzepecki (brother); Danuta Siedzikówna (great-granddaughter); Wiesława Korzeń (great-granddaughter)
- Children: 5

Military service
- Allegiance: Russian Empire
- Branch/service: Russian Imperial Army
- Years of service: 1875–1894
- Rank: Podpolkovnik
- Unit: 1st Caucasus Army Corps
- Wars: Russo-Turkish War

Lieutenant Colonel Karl Edward Karlovich Rjepetsky (born: Karol Edward Karlovich Rzepecki; 10 August 1847 – 12 November 1894) was a Russian lieutenant colonel in the 19th century who served during the Russo-Turkish War. His body was re-discovered during excavations to lay the foundation of a new building in 2017. His body was then reburied in Ardahan, Türkiye.

== Early life ==
Karl Edward Rjepetsky was born in Reval, Governorate of Estonia, Russian Empire (now Tallinn, Estonia) on 10 August 1847 to Karol Ivanovich Rzepecki and Aalia Rzepecka, and was one of 7 children.

== Military career ==
After graduating from Warsaw Infantry Cadets School, Rjepetsky joined the Russian Imperial Army in the 69th Tashkent Guberniyası Battalion in 1875 and rose to the rank of Podpolkovnik (lieutenant colonel) of the 1st Turkistan Artillery Battalion in 1891. He was later assigned to the 78th Navagin Regiment of the 20th Infantry Division in the 1st Caucasus Army Corps. He took part in the Russian-Turkish War, after which he may have settled in the Occupied Region. Three of his brothers also were soldiers at the same time as he was.

== Awards ==
=== Orders ===
- 1876 Order of Saint Stanislaus, 3rd class
- 1877 Order of Saint Anna, 3rd class
- 1877 Order of Saint Stanislaus, 2nd class

=== Medals ===
- Medal "For the Conquest of the Kokand Khanate"

== Personal life ==
Rjepetsky was married to Helena Rzepecka (née Kamieńska; 1865–1937). Together they had 5 children: Maria (1883–1954), Helena (1885–1968), Zofia (1886–1890), unknown name (born between 1870 and 1894) and Nikolai Karlovich (born between 1870 and 1894).

He was the older brother of major general Vladimir Rzepecki and younger brother of colonel Mikołaj Rzepecki (1840 - 1914) and lieutenant Aleksander Konstantin Rzepecki (1849-1899). He was also the grandfather of Brunon Tymiński, co-grandfather of Herman Tymiński, and the maternal great-grandfather of Danuta Siedzikówna and her sister, Wiesława Korzeń.

== Death and discovery ==
According to the death certificate given by an Armenian Catholic priest who has buried him, Rjepetsky died from a cerebral haemorrhage;

"I, Ter-Stepan Zakaryan, the priest of the Ardahan Armenian Catholic Church, buried Lieutenant Colonel Karl Karlovich Rjepetsky, in Ardahan Russian Cemetery, in the name of Holy Mother of God. Born in August 10th 1847, died in November 12th 1894 of cerebral haemorrhage, as confirmed by the senior doctor of the regiment, I certify the death certificate of the late Lieutenant Colonel Rjepetsky with my signature and church seal."

His body was re-discovered in April 2017 during excavations to lay the foundation of a new building in Ardahan amongst numerous Imperial Russian corpses. The corpse was kept safe at Kars Museum until the negotiations between Poland and Russia would be finished as both argued that Rjepetsky should be buried in their respective territories. In the end, Rjepetsky was buried at Ardahan's Malakanlar Cemetery where Russians lived in Ardahan when it was still controlled by them. According to Ardahan governor, Russia's consulate in the nearby province of Trabzon attended the burial.
