= Kotliarka =

Village in Zhytomyr Oblast, Ukraine

Kotliarka Котлярка Kotlyarka
- Village
- Location within Zhytomyr Oblast Location within Ukraine
- Coordinates: 50°01′40″N 29°19′55″E
- Country: Ukraine
- Oblast: Zhytomyr Oblast
- Raion: Zhytomyr Raion
- First mentioned: 1700s

Government
  - Type: Village Council
  - Body: 12
  - Chairman: Nelia Nazaruk

Area
  - Land: 2.37 km^{2} (0.92 sq mi)
- Elevation: 210 m (690 ft)

Population
  - Total: 429
  - Density: 181/km^{2} (470/sq mi)
- Time zone: UTC+2 (EET)
  - Summer (DST): UTC+3 (EEST)
- Postal code: 13523
- Area code: +380 4137

Kotliarka or Kotlyarka (Ukrainian: Котлярка [kotˈlʲɑrkɐ]) is a village in Ukraine, located in the Zhytomyr Raion of the Zhytomyr Oblast (province). The village belongs to an eponymous village council - the Kotliarka village council.

== Geography ==
The village is situated in the northwest of the Dnieper Upland and the right-bank Ukraine.

The village council area borders the Andrushivka Raion in the west and village councils of the Popilna Raion: Lypky in the east, Khodorkiv in the north, Sokilcha in the south-west, Velyki Lisivtsi in the south and Myroliubivka in the south-east.

The river Kryvenka (Ukrainian: Кривенька, English: Curved) flows through the village into the Unava River, which flows into the Irpin River of the Dnieper basin. There is a pond on the river in the village, that is called the Kryvenka Reservoir.

Two forests are near the village towards Markova Volytsіa and Liubymivka. They were part of a large forest in the Popilnia Raion; the forest was significantly reduced because of the high demand for potash in the 14th to 19th centuries, which required large amounts of wood.

First language of the villagers according to the Ukrainian Census (2001)
1. Ukrainian (97.1%)
2. Russian (2.65%)
3. Romanian (0.20%)

== History ==
=== Early time ===
Serpent's Wall and ancient kurgans were discovered next to the village. The Ukrainian historian Volodymyr Antonovych mentioned the village in his work "The archaeological map of the Kiev Governorate" 1895. He marked 2 large and 12 small kurgans in 3 kilometres from the village.

Before the Kievan Rus epoch it was a territory of the Eastern Polans.

=== Russian Empire period ===
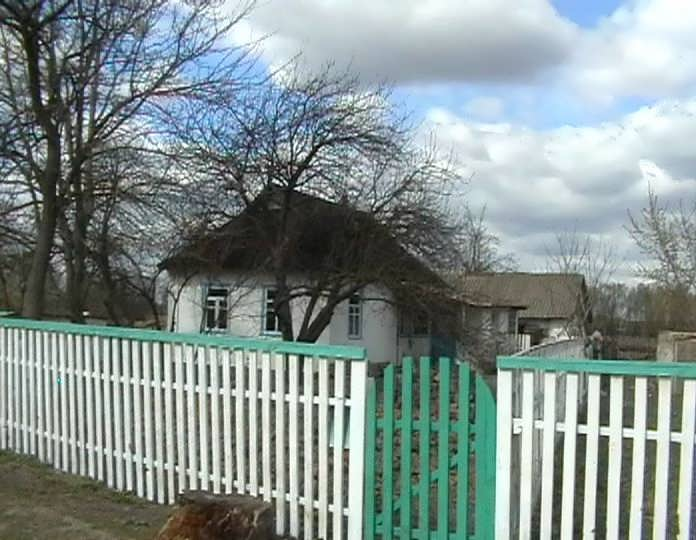
A typical premises in the village.

The ethnographer Lavrentii Pokhylevych in his work "Tales of inhabited areas of the Kiev province" mentioned the village. In 1835 Kotliarka belonged to the Skvyra Povit (Uezd) and the parish of the Holy Dormition church in the neighbour village Sokilcha. The owners of the village were descendants of August Slyvynsky. There were 520 Orthodox Christians and 100 Catholics in the village.

In 1878–1879, the riot of chynshovyks (quit-renters), who were tenants and former noblemen, started in the village. They took back the land they had previously rented from the landlord Slyvynsky for quit-rents. The land had been leased by a sugar company from Khodorkiv for the high rental payment. After police arrested the riot organiser Baladinski, he was released by about 40 of his comrades. The police stopped the riot and arrested 26 rebels. However, the landlord was advised to refrain from attempts to change the tenants of the land.

According to the Russian Empire Census in 1897 the rural population of the Skvyra Povit consisted of 86.65% Ukrainian, 9.69% Jewish, 2.51% Polish and 0.95% Russian speaking people.

=== Soviet era ===
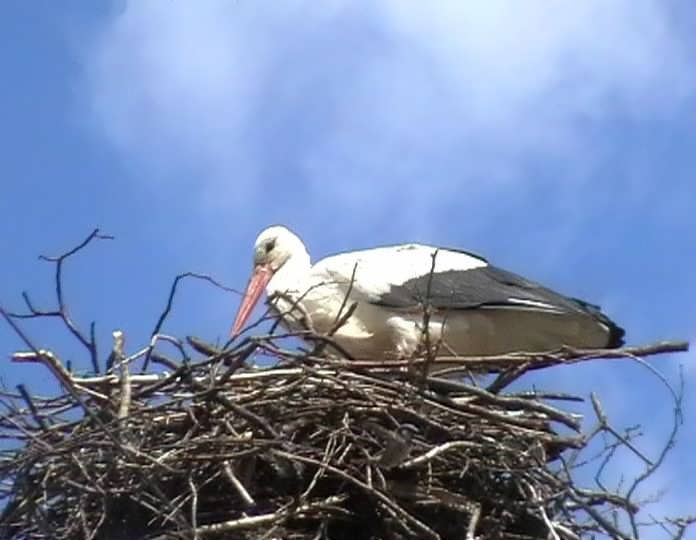
A nest of white storks in the village.

There were names of 101 victims of the Holodomor 1932-1933 ascertained based on the stories of the eyewitnesses S. Babych, P. Vilchynska, Y. Zavadska, S. Monastyretsky and S. Sokyrko.

During the political repression in the Soviet Union, especially in the Great Purge, a lot of villagers were executed or deported. Ethnic Ukrainian families, such as the Babych, Blinkevych and Vitkivsky, and Polish families, including the Baladinski, Czopiwski and Zawadski were subjected to repression.

Many villagers were conscripted into the Red Army and killed during the Winter War (Soviet–Finnish War 1939–1940).

During the Nazi occupation of 1941–1943 the village was in the Ruzhyn Gebiet of the Zhytomyr General Okruha of the Reichskommissariat Ukraine.

== Prominent people ==
- Grygorii Motsak - a Hero of Socialist Labor, member of the Supreme Soviet of the Soviet Union of 8 to 11 convocations.
- Leonid Monastyretsky - an Honored education worker of Ukraine, professor of modern Ukrainian literature and social communication of the University of Zhytomyr.
- Roman Okseniuk - a historian, ethnographer of Volhynia, docent and head of the department of history of the Lesya Ukrainka East European National University.
- Valentyna Nazaruk - a Mother Heroine
- Petruk Tetyana - a Mother Heroine
