= Brusyliv =

Brusyliv (Ukrainian: Брусилів) may refer to:

- Brusyliv, Zhytomyr Oblast, a rural settlement in Zhytomyr Raion, Zhytomyr Oblast, Ukraine
- Brusyliv, Chernihiv Oblast, a village in Chernihiv Raion, Chernihiv Oblast, Ukraine
- Brusyliv Raion, an administrative raion (district) of Zhytomyr Oblast of Ukraine

== See also ==
- Brusilov (disambiguation)
