= Pavoloch =

Village in Zhytomyr Oblast, Ukraine

Pavoloch Паволоч
- Village
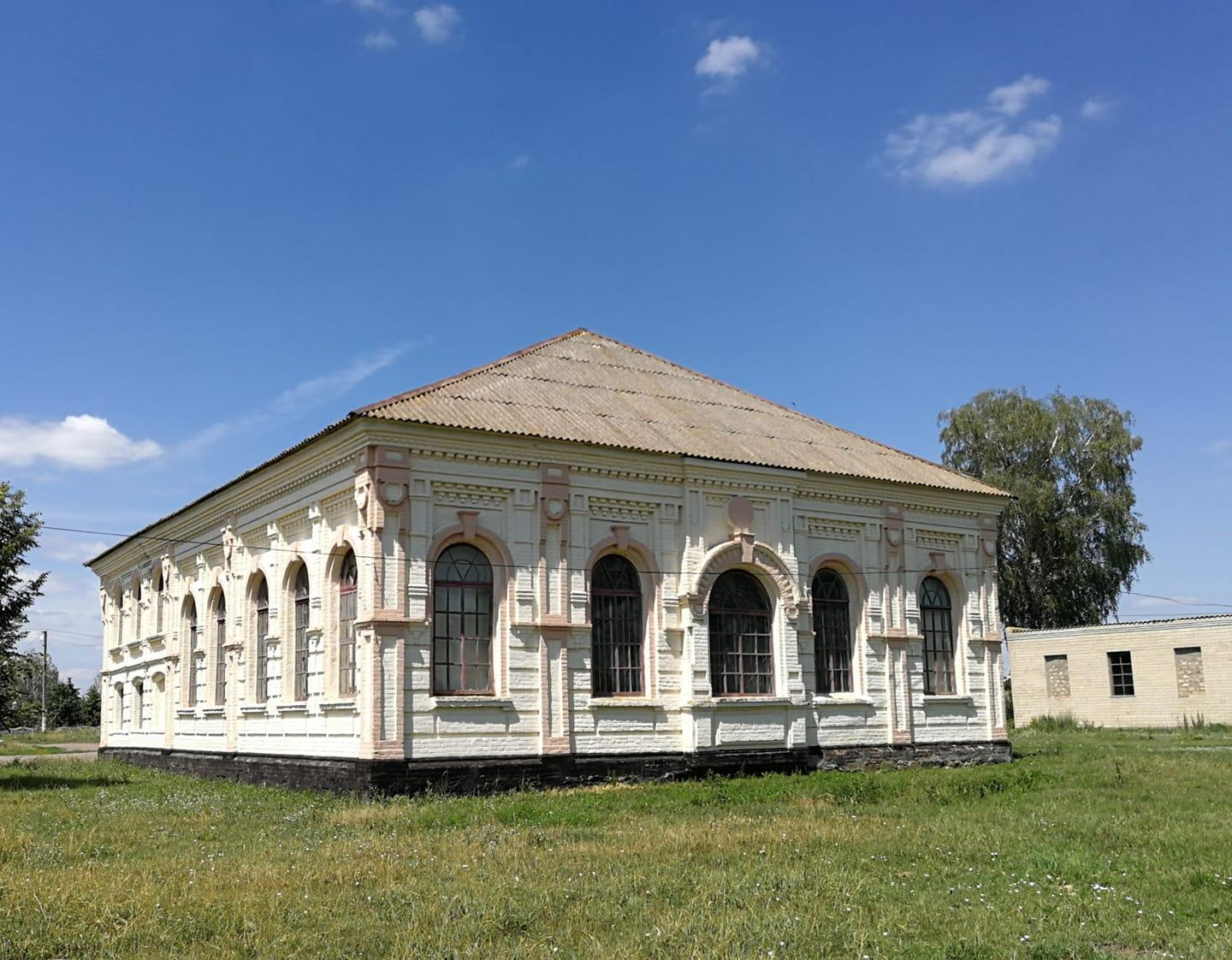

- Location in Ukraine Pavoloch (Zhytomyr Oblast)
- Country: Ukraine
- Oblast: Zhytomyr Oblast
- Raion: Zhytomyr Raion
- Hromada: Popilnia settlement hromada
- Time zone: UTC+2 (EET)
  - Summer (DST): UTC+3 (EEST)

Pavoloch (German: Pawolotsch; Polish: Pawołocz; Russian: Паволочь; Yiddish: Pavolitsh) is a village in Zhytomyr Raion, Zhytomyr Oblast in central Ukraine. It was a town of the Cossack Hetmanate and an administrative seat of Pavoloch Regiment (province).

== Jewish history ==
It is estimated that Pavoloch was founded sometime in the Middle Ages, but it first appeared on Ruthenian chronicles in 1503. The majority of Pavoloch's inhabitants were Jews. The Jews in Pavoloch, as in many other shtetls, were victims of constant prejudice. When they got fed up with being harassed, the citizens build a wooden fort around their shtetl, which gave Pavoloch's inhabitants increased protection against invaders. It was a good thing that the people of Pavoloch built their fort, because their settlement was a constant pit-stop for advancing and retreating armies. Aside from the occasional prejudice, the Jews of Pavoloch lived in harmony with one another, with no fights breaking out among themselves.

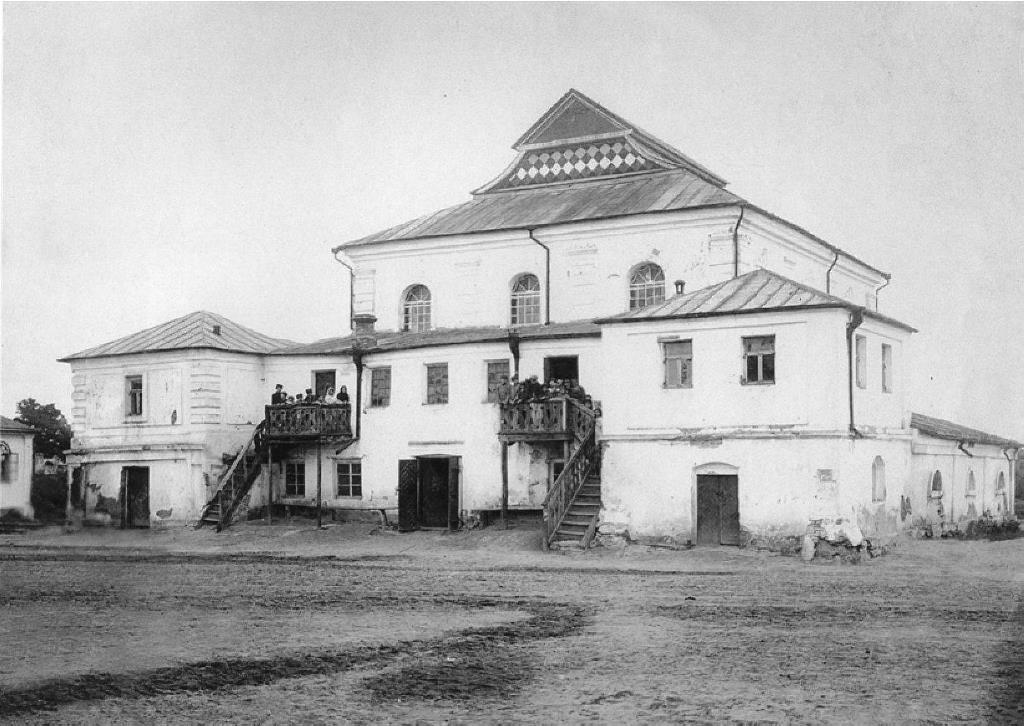
Former synagogue in 1912

In 1736, a rebellious paramilitary group, the Haidamakas, carried out a massacre against the Jews of Pavoloch, killing 35 people. When they finished pillaging the shtetl, the killers hastily left. Ironically, only 3 decades afterwards, Pavoloch's population began to increase, with a total population of 1,041 in 1765. In 1910, Pavoloch's population swelled to 15,454 people.

During the Russian Civil War of 1917–1923, most of the inhabitants of Pavoloch left, most likely in fear of the encroaching Bolshevik army. The brave, remaining Jews stayed in Pavoloch, throughout the war. The population continued to decline, up to World War II, during Operation Barbarossa, when a Nazi Einsatzgruppen (SS) squad drove into Pavoloch. The Nazis rounded up all the Jews, and killed them in what is known as the Pavoloch Massacre, making them dig their own graves before shooting them. To this day, there are no Jews in Pavoloch.

The Red Army liberated Pavoloch in December 1943.

Today, Pavoloch remains a historic community, visited by tourists, descendants of men and women who lived in the shtetl, and people who are interested in its history.

== Location ==
Pavoloch is 100 km southwest of Kyiv, in the Zhytomyr Oblast.

== Geography ==
Pavoloch's geography is fairly flat, with forested plains. It is on the Rostavytsia River.

== Notable people ==
- Franciszek Kowalski (1799–1862), Polish poet
