= Brusilov Nunataks =

Geological features in Antarctica

The Brusilov Nunataks (66°42′S 52°24′E) are a group of nunataks lying 6 nautical miles (11 km) north of Mount Morrison in the Tula Mountains, Enderby Land. The geology of the nunataks was investigated by the Soviet Antarctic Expedition, 1961–62, which named them after the Russian polar explorer G.L. Brusilov.
