= 38th Tobolsk Infantry Regiment =

Тобольский 38-й пехотный полк
- Тобольский 38-й пехотный полк
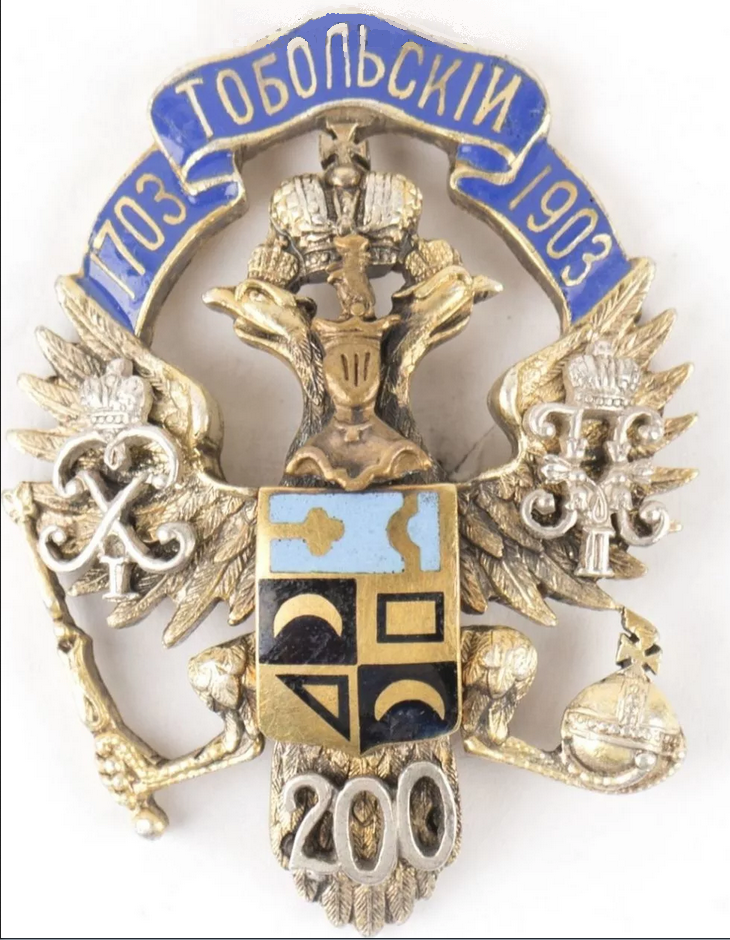
- Regimental badge
- Active: 1703 - 1918
- Country: Russian Empire
- Branch: Imperial Russian Army; Russian Army (1917)
- Type: Infantry
- Size: Regiment
- Garrison/HQ: Varying
- Anniversaries: December 25th, the regimental holiday

The 38th Tobolsk Infantry Regiment (Russian: 38-й пехотный Тобольский полк) is a regiment in the Imperial Russian Army.

== History ==
The regiment was formed on December 17, 1703, during the reign of Peter the Great. Tikhon Streshnev formed an infantry regiment in Moscow. It was drawn from volunteers and townspeople and consisted of 10 companies: one grenadier company and nine fusilier companies (with about 150 men in each company). Upon its formation, the regiment received nine banners (matching the number of fusilier companies).

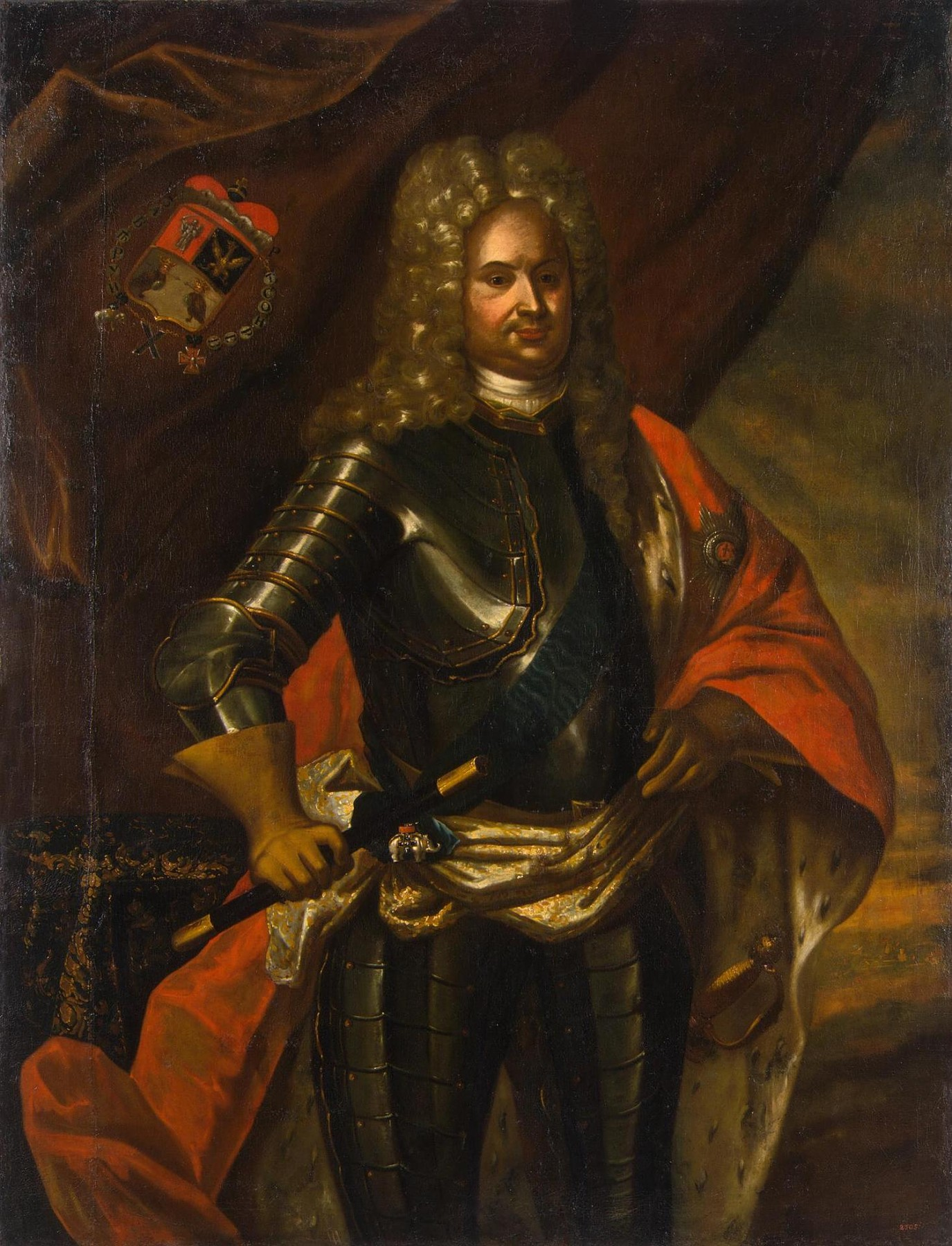
Anikita Repnin

Before the regiment was known as the 38th Tobolsk Infantry Regiment, it was first named after its honorary commander, General Anikita Repnin, the regiment was named the Infantry Regiment of General Repnin The companies were named after the surnames of their respective company commanders. Each company had its own banner of an arbitrary color, while the banner of the first company, which served as the regimental banner, was always white.

The regiment was armed with volunteers armed with blackpowder rifles, pikes, and swords, like most other russian regiments at the time. They were very unequiped.

On the 20th of August 1704, the regiment engaged in the Great Northern War, during the siege of Narva.

On March 21st, 1708, the Infantry Regiment of General Repnin was renamed into the Tobolsk Infantry Regiment, due to a decree from Peter the Great. On that same day the regiment removed a grenadier company from its ranks to join the Ladoga 16th Infantry Regiment.

From 1710 to 1713 the regiment was sent to fight in the Russo-Turkish War.

The regiment was sent to Warsaw to fight in the War of the Polish Succession in the siege of Danzig.

On July 20th 1753, the Tobolsk Regiment's battalions were reorganized. The regiment was reduced to a three-battalion structure each consisting of four fusilier companies (169 men in each company) with one grenadier company (233 men in each company). The regiment's strength was 2,859 men. The addition of a grenadier company to the battalion strengthened the defensive and offensive capabilities of the military units.

On March 124th 1762, the Tobolsk Regiment's battalions were reorganized. The regiment was reduced to a two-battalion structure — each consisting of five musketeer companies (146 men in each company) with one grenadier company (178 men in each company). The regiment's strength was 1,930 men.

On November 29 (December 10), 1796, the Tobolsk Infantry Regiment was named the Tobolsk Musketeer Regiment.

On January 16th 1798, the Tobolsk Regiment's battalions were reorganized. The regiment was reorganized into a two-battalion structure, each battalion consisting of five musketeer companies (157 men in each company) and one grenadier company (159 men in each company). The regiment's strength was 2,126 men.

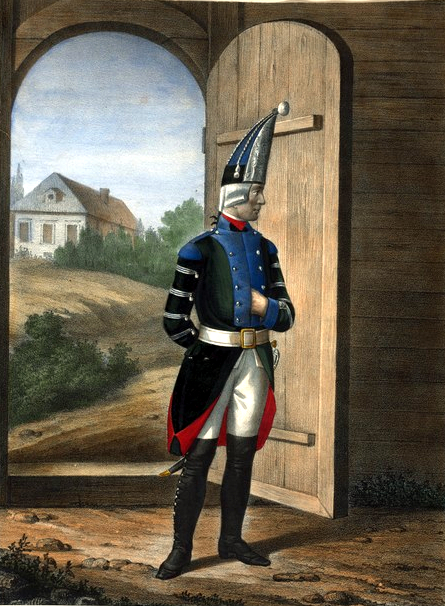
Grenadier drummer of the Tobolsk Musketeer Regiment (in 1797-1801)

In May 12th 1802 the Tobolsk Regiment's battalions were reorganized. The regiment was reduced to a three-battalion structure (one grenadier and two musketeer), each with four companies. The regiment's strength in wartime was 2,459 men (each musketeer company had 183 men, and each grenadier company had 185 men), and in peacetime, 2,168 men (each musketeer company had 159 men, and each grenadier company had 161 men).

The regiment participated in the construction of the Daugavpils Fortress from 1810 to 1812.

In the French invasion of Russia, the battalions of the Tobolsk Infantry Regiment operated as part of the 4th Infantry Division of the 2nd Army Corps of the 1st Western Army.

From August 16th to August 19th of 1812, the Tobolsk regiment took part in the bloody Battle of Smolensk.

On September 7th 1812, during the Battle of Borodino, the Tobolsk Regiment was operating as part of the 4th Division, the Tobolsk Regiment covered one of the most critical strategic directions, the battery of Raevsky.

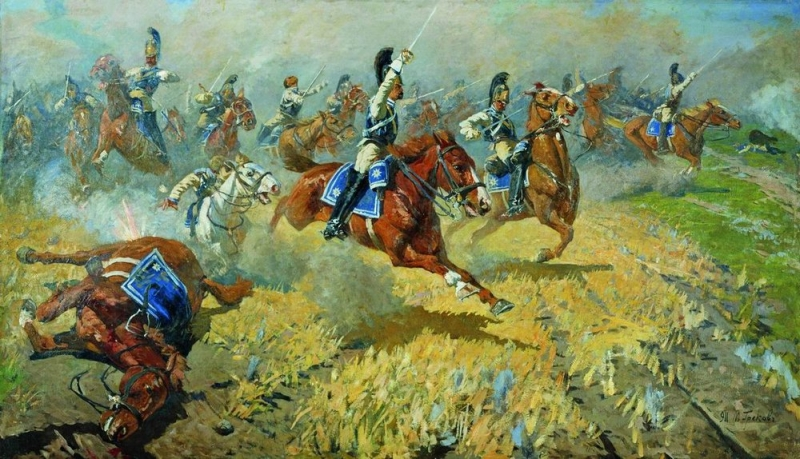
Battle of Krichwitz

Formed in battalion squares, the Tobolsk regiment repelled six attacks by French dragoons and lancers. They were among the last regiments to leave the battle of Borodino, suffering heavy casualties that amounted to over half of their total personnel.

From 1812 to 1813 the regiment took parts in the battles of Krasnoi, Vyazma, Bautzen, Dresden, Krichwitz, Teplitz, Gisgübel, Zegist, Hellendorf, and Leipzig.

The 38th Infantry Regiment was disbanded in 1918.

== Organization ==
As of 1914, the regiment was a part of the 1st Infantry Brigade, which belonged to the 10th Infantry Division.
