= Vladimir Rzepecki =

Russian Empire Major General (1853–1914)

Vladimir Mikhail Karlovich Rzepecki
- Владимир Михайлович Ржепецкий
- Born: 7 November 1853; Reval, Russian Empire
- Died: 6 September 1914 (aged 60); Troitskoye, Tashkent Uyezd, Russian Empire
- Burial place: Botkin Cemetery, Tashkent
- Military career
- Allegiance: Russian Empire
- Branch: Infantry
- Service years: 1870–1905
- Rank: Major General
- Commands: 17th East Siberian Rifle Regiment of His Imperial Highness Grand Duke Alexei Alexandrovich
- Conflicts: Campaigns against the Khiva and Kokand Khanates
- Awards: Gold Sword for Bravery; Order of Saint Vladimir; Order of Saint Anna; Order of Saint Stanislaus; Order of the Noble Bukhara

Vladimir Mikhail Karlovich Rzepecki (Rzhepetsky) (7 November 1853, Reval, Russian Empire – 6 September 1914, Troitskoye, Tashkent Uyezd, Russian Empire) was a Major General of the Russian Empire. He participated in Russian military campaigns in Central Asia, particularly in the regions of Khiva and Kokand.

== Biography ==
Rzhepetsky was a member of the ancient Polish noble family of Rzhepetsky. He was educated at the Voronezh Cadet Corps.

He began his military service on 30 August 1870 as a junker after enrolling in the 3rd Alexander Military School. On 21 July 1872, he graduated from the school with first-class honors and was commissioned as a second lieutenant in the 1st Turkestan Rifle Battalion.

On 18 January 1874, for distinguished service during operations in the Khiva Khanate, he was promoted to lieutenant. On 16 November 1876, for his achievements in campaigns against the Khanate of Kokand, he was promoted to staff captain. On 7 June 1880, he was promoted to captain for meritorious service.

In 1885, he graduated from the Officer Rifle School with distinction. On 25 July 1890, he was transferred to the 4th Turkestan Rifle Battalion. On 26 February 1891, he was promoted to lieutenant colonel and assigned to the 88th Reserve Infantry Cadre Battalion. On 20 March 1891, he returned to the 1st Turkestan Rifle Battalion.

On 31 July 1900, Rzhepetsky was promoted to colonel and appointed commander of the 1st Turkestan Rifle Battalion. On 2 September 1903, he became the commander of the 17th East Siberian Rifle Regiment of His Imperial Highness Grand Duke Alexei Alexandrovich. On 13 July 1905, he was promoted to Major General.

On 2 August 1905, he retired due to illness, receiving a uniform and pension.

Rzhepetsky died on 6 September 1914 in his estate near Troitskoye, Tashkent Uyezd, from chronic pneumonia. He was buried at the Botkin Cemetery in Tashkent.

== Awards ==
=== Orders ===
- Order of Saint Anna, 4th class with the inscription "For Bravery" (21 January 1874)
- Order of Saint Stanislaus, 3rd class with swords and bow (15 February 1876)
- Order of Saint Anna, 3rd class with swords and bow (28 January 1877)
- Order of Saint Stanislaus, 2nd class with swords (28 January 1877)
- Order of Saint Anna, 2nd class (29 December 1888)
- Order of Saint Vladimir, 4th class with the inscription "For 25 years of service" (4 March 1898)
- Order of Saint Vladimir, 3rd class with swords (6 December 1904)
- Gold Sword for Bravery (11 November 1904)
- Order of the Noble Bukhara, 3rd class (29 November 1897)

=== Medals ===
- Medal "For the Khivan Campaign"
- Medal "For the Conquest of the Kokand Khanate"
- Medal "In Commemoration of the Reign of Emperor Alexander III"
- Silver Medal "For Campaigns in Central Asia 1853–1895"

== Personal life ==
Vladimir Mikhail was the younger brother of Karl Karlovich Rjepetski (1847–1894), a lieutenant colonel, whose remains were discovered in April 2017 in the Turkish city of Ardahan. Initially, the remains were thought to belong to Russian general Vasily Geyman, a participant in the Russo-Turkish War of 1877–78.
