= Black Path =

Coordinates: 51.573°N 0.0384°W

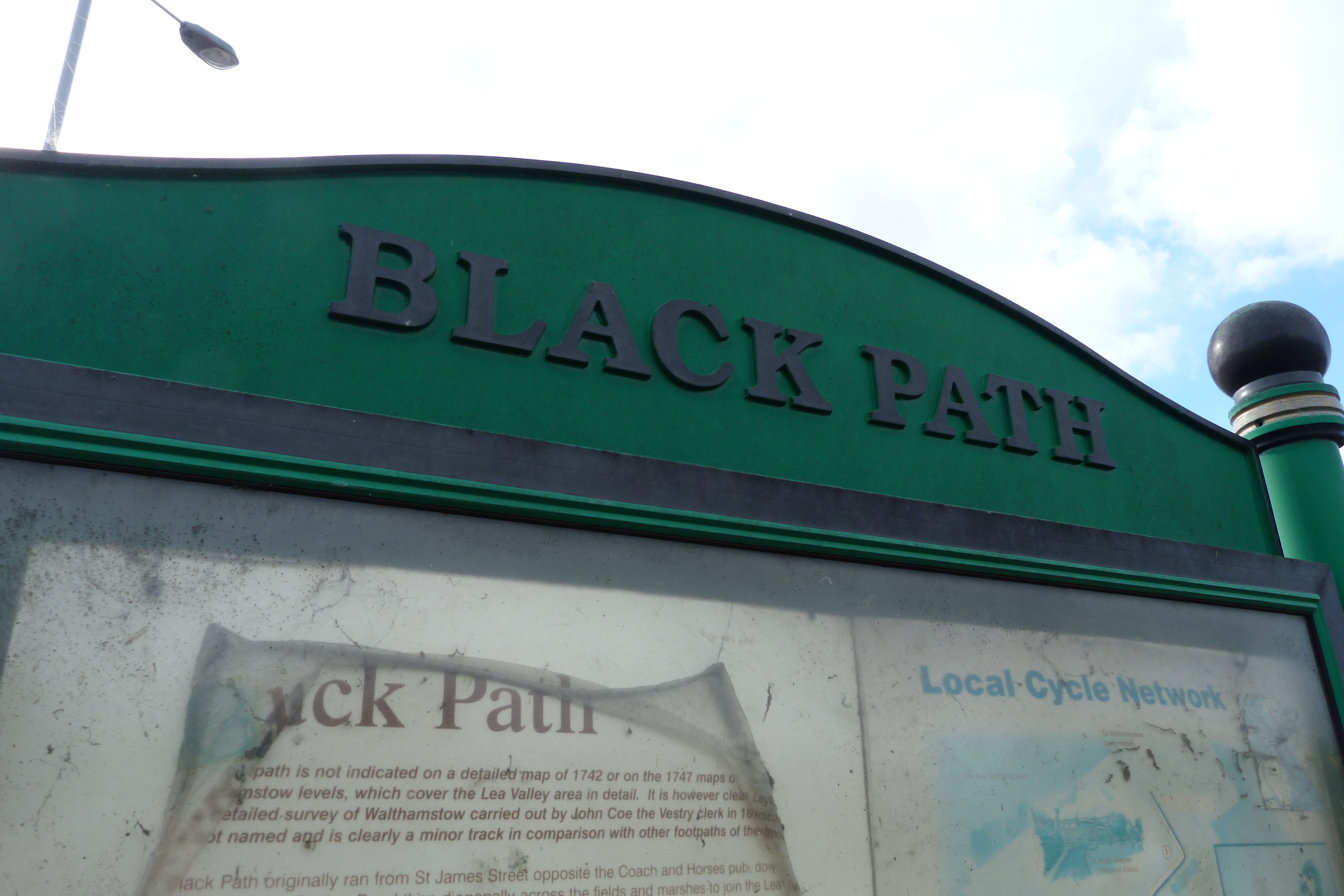
Black Path sign in Walthamstow

Black Path is an ancient route between markets in London, England. It runs from Walthamstow to Hackney, passing Broadway Market, Columbia Road and Smithfield.

The path is also known as the Templars’ Path and the Porters’ Way. The route is in use today for cycling and walking.
