= Skvira uezd =

Skvira uezd Сквирскій уѣздъ
- Uezd
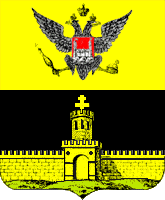
- Coat of arms

- Location in the Kiev Governorate
- Country: Russian Empire
- Krai: Southwestern
- Governorate: Kiev
- Established: 1796
- Abolished: 1923
- Capital: Skvira

Area
  - Total: 3,722 km^{2} (1,437 sq mi)

Population (1897)
  - Total: 251,257
  - Density: 67.51/km^{2} (174.8/sq mi)

The Skvira uezd (Russian: Сквирскій уѣздъ, romanized: Skvirskiy uyezd; Ukrainian: Сквирський повіт, romanized: Skvyrs'kyi povit) was one of the subdivisions of the Kiev Governorate of the Russian Empire, in the western part of the governorate. Its administrative centre was Skvira (Skvyra).

== Demographics ==
At the time of the Russian Empire Census of 1897, Skvirsky Uyezd had a population of 251,257. Of these, 83.5% spoke Ukrainian, 12.5% Yiddish, 2.4% Polish, 1.3% Russian and 0.1% German as their native language.
