= Herman Tymiński =

Polish Orthodox priest (1843–1896)

- Born: c. 1843s Boćki Grodno Governorate, Russian Empire
- Died: March 12, 1896; Krasnystok, Grodno Governorate, Russian Empire
- Occupation: Priest
- Spouse: Pelagia Tymińska (née Kalinowska)
- Children: Włodzimierz, Zofia, Jan, Olga

Herman Tymiński (German Tymiński; ros. Герман Тиминский; 1843 Boćki - 12 March 1896, Krasnystok, presently Różanystok) was an Orthodox priest active in the Grodno Governorate of the Russian Empire. He is remembered for his long and devoted ministry in Marian Sanctuary in the town of Krasnystok, where he revitalized religious life.

== Biography ==
Michał Tymiński (b.1740) (son of Gregory (Grzegorz)), the grandfather of Herman, was an Uniate parish priest in the village of Andryjanki of Sapieha and Potocki. Herman's father, Jakob (Jakub) Tymiński (b. 1800), served as Uniate parish priest in Drohiczyn and Boćki. Both of Herman's brothers were also Orthodox priests, Peter (1879–1908) in the churches in Strugi-Buklicze and Rubel, and Platon (1832-1893) in Oltush transfiguration church and in Włodawa. The last priest in the family was Peter's son, Afanasy (Афанасий, b. 1860), who served as parish priest at the Synkovichskaya Church, St. Vladimir's Church in Grodno, the Church of St. Nicholas in Nikolskoye-Gagarino, and the Church of St. Michael the Archangel in Mikhailovskoye.

Tymiński studied at the Lithuanian Theological Seminary and was ordained as a priest on 17 January 1864. His first appointment was to the parish church in Łasza in Grodno district.

Before 1871 he probably moved to Boćki, where his son Jan was born.

Shortly thereafter, he was transferred to Krasnystok. Father Herman had served in Krasnystok for 24 years.

He died from typhoid and epidemic typhus on 12 March 1896, fully conscious, blessing his wife and children before his death.

He was the grandfather of Brunon Tymiński, co-grandfather of Karol Rzepecki and the great-grandfather of Danuta Siedzikówna and Wiesława Korzeń.

== Legacy ==
Krasnystok is known for its miracle-working icon of the Mother of God and attracts numerous pilgrims. During the tenure of Fr. Herman, the parish underwent significant revival after a period of decline. Contemporary accounts attribute the restoration of religious life and increased pilgrimage—among both Orthodox and Catholic faithful—to his efforts. Reports also indicate that members of neighboring Uniate Church communities began participating more frequently in services and sacraments at Krasnystok. The restoration took place amid local tensions and resistance, reflecting broader religious and social divisions in the region.

A saying associated with his legacy states, “The honor of a good man shall be remembered from age to age,” reflecting his reputation for humility and service.
