= Platon Tymiński =

- Dean of the Włodawa Deanery
- Native name: Платонъ Тыминскій

Orders
- Ordination: 14 March 1856

Personal details
- Born: c. 1832
- Died: 18 February 1893 Vilna, Vilna Governorate, Russian Empire
- Education: Lithuanian Theological Seminary

Platon Tymiński (Russian: Платонъ Тыминскій; c. 1832 – 18 February 1893) was an Eastern Orthodox priest who served as rector of the Orthodox church in Oltush and as dean (blagochinny) of the Włodawa deanery in the Vilna Governorate of the Russian Empire. He was also involved in public education and held several administrative positions within the diocese. In 1892, he was awarded the Order of Saint Anna, 3rd class.

== Early life and education ==
Platon Tymiński was born into a family of the Orthodox clergy. His brother was Herman Tymiński, whose grandfather was Michał Tymiński. He studied at the Lithuanian Theological Seminary. After completing his course of study, he was dismissed from the seminary in 1855 with a second-class certificate. On 14 March 1856, he was ordained a priest and assigned to the Orthodox church in Oltush.

== Ecclesiastical career ==
In 1869, Tymiński was elected by the clergy as assistant dean of the Wlodawa deanery. On 23 June 1870, he was appointed to the deanery council.

In 1871, he was elected for a three-year term as a clergy representative to the Zhirovichi Educational District. That year, he was also appointed to investigate a case concerning the conduct of Orthodox clergy in Gvoznitsa.

On 18 February 1874, Tymiński was reappointed assistant dean for a second four-year term and returned to the deanery council. On 30 March, he was awarded a purple skufia.

On 19 October 1878, he was appointed dean. He remained in the position into the 1880s and was confirmed for another term on 13 November 1882. In 1879, he received an archpastoral commendation for improvements to his church and donations made to it. In 1880, he was awarded a purple velvet kamilavka.

On 13 February 1881, Tymiński was appointed censor of sermons in the deanery. In 1882, he served as a delegate to the Fourth Lithuanian Diocesan Assembly. On 5 April 1885, he became ecclesiastical inspector of public and parish schools in the Wlodawa deanery. In 1887, he was awarded a pectoral cross.

== Work in education ==
Tymiński also worked in public education. In 1864, he was appointed teacher of the Law of God at the Oltush Public School, where he taught until 20 September 1873, when he left the position because of illness.

His work as a teacher was recognized by the educational and diocesan authorities. On 31 December 1867, the curator of the Vilna Educational District commended his work in public education. On 8 January 1882, the diocesan authorities recognized his educational work and service to the Church.

The Grodno Directorate of Public Schools commended his teaching of the Law of God on 21 January 1884 and again recognized his work at the public school on 18 November 1886. On 22 March 1885, the Ministry of Public Education also recognized his work in public education.

== Honors ==
On 24 November 1862, Tymiński received an archpastoral blessing for his service. His later distinctions included the purple skufia (1874), purple velvet kamilavka (1880), and a pectoral cross (1887).

For twelve consecutive years of service as dean, Tymiński was awarded the Order of Saint Anna, 3rd class, on 3 February 1892.

- Order of Saint Anna, 3rd class (3 February 1892)

== Death and funeral ==
On 16 February 1893, while attending to official business with Donat, Archbishop of Lithuania and Vilna, Tymiński suffered a stroke. He died two days later, on 18 February, aged 61. His funeral service was held on 18 February at the Church of St. Sergius at Vilno Cathedral. The service was conducted by Archbishop Donat, assisted by members of the cathedral clergy and other priests. Later that day, Tymiński's remains were taken to Malaryta for burial.

== Family ==
Platon was husband of Иоанновна Pawłowicz and had two daughters Parascewa Płatonowna Charkiewicz (Параскева Платоновна Харкевич) and (Płatonowna Sitkiewicz) Платоновна Ситкевич: one was married to Staff Captain Kharkevich of the 2nd Brest-Litovsk Reserve Infantry Battalion, while the other was married to a priest named Sitkevich.
