= Sasiny =

Sasiny may refer to the following places:

- Sasiny, Gmina Boćki in Podlaskie Voivodeship (north-east Poland)
- Sasiny, Gmina Wyszki in Podlaskie Voivodeship (north-east Poland)
- Sasiny, Zambrów County in Podlaskie Voivodeship (north-east Poland)
- Sasiny, Warmian-Masurian Voivodeship (north Poland)
