= Żołoćki =

- Village
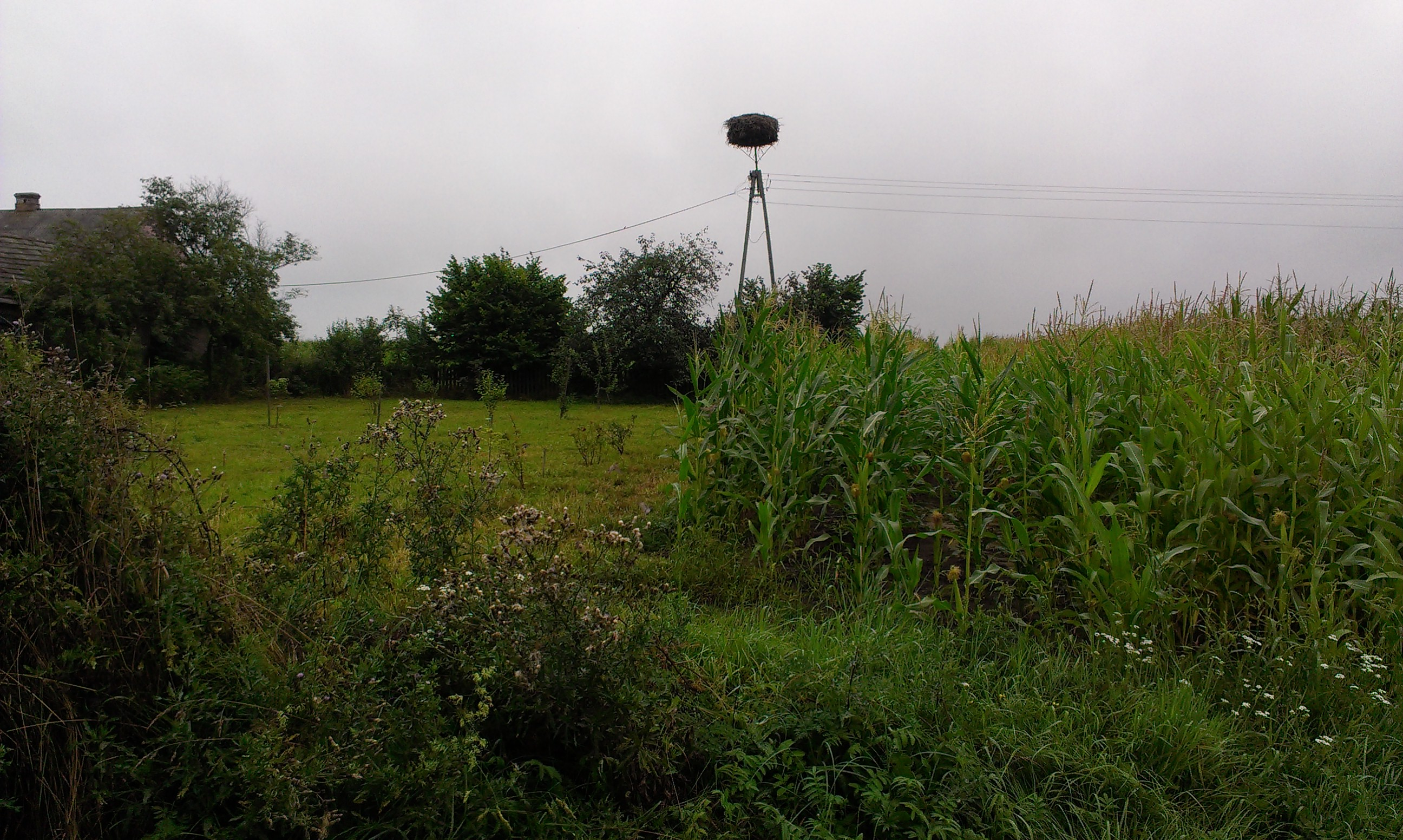
- Ciconia nests Żołoćki

- Location within Poland
- Coordinates: 52°38′23″N 22°56′12″E
- Country: Poland
- Voivodeship: Podlaskie
- County: Bielsk
- Gmina: Boćki

Zhołocki (Belarusian. Залочкі), formerly Żołodźki, is a village in Poland located in Podlaskie Voivodeship, in Bielsk County, in Boćki commune.

In the years 1975–1998 the locality administratively belonged to Białystok Voivodeship.

According to the 1921 census the village of Żołoćki had 98 inhabitants living in 14 buildings. 58% of the village's inhabitants (57 people) declared Roman Catholic, while the remaining 42% (i.e. 41 people) Orthodox. At the same time, the majority of the village's inhabitants (83 people) declared Polish nationality, and the remaining 15 people declared Belarusian nationality. At that time, the village was located in Widźgowo commune.

The village has retained its bi-denominational character to this day. The Roman Catholic inhabitants of the village belong to Parish of Our Lady Help of Christians in Klichy, and the Orthodox to Parish of the Dormition of the Mother of God in Boćki.
