= Piotrowo-Trojany =

- Village
- Location within Poland
- Coordinates: 52°36′7″N 22°56′21″E
- Country: Poland
- Voivodeship: Podlaskie
- County: Bielsk
- Gmina: Boćki

Piotrowo-Trojany [pjɔˈtrɔvɔ trɔˈjanɨ] is a village in the administrative district of Gmina Boćki within Bielsk County, which is part of the Podlaskie Voivodeship in north-eastern Poland.
