= Wiercień, Podlaskie Voivodeship =

Wiercień
- Village
- Location within Poland
- Coordinates: 52°41′N 23°2′E
- Country: Poland
- Voivodeship: Podlaskie
- County: Bielsk
- Gmina: Boćki

Wiercień [ˈvjɛrt͡ɕɛɲ] is a village in the administrative district of Gmina Boćki, within Bielsk County, Podlaskie Voivodeship, in north-eastern Poland.
