= Kolonia Boćki =

- Settlement
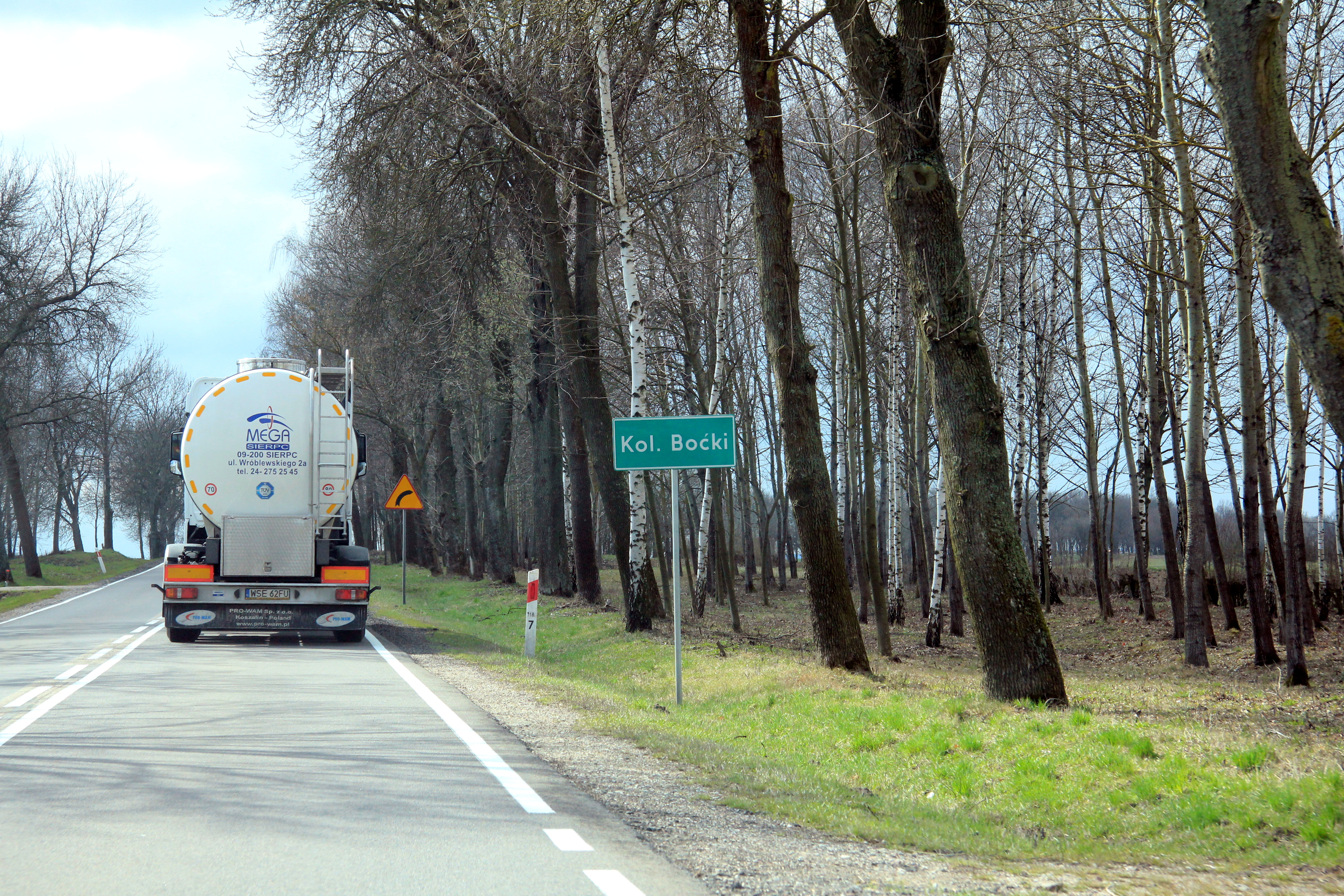

- Location within Poland
- Coordinates: 52°38′26.36″N 23°01′20.05″E
- Country: Poland
- Voivodeship: Podlaskie
- County: Bielsk
- Gmina: Boćki

Kolonia Boćki (until 2006 called Przy Ostaszach [ˈpʂɨ ɔsˈtaʂax]) is a settlement in the administrative district of Gmina Boćki, within Bielsk County, Podlaskie Voivodeship, in north-eastern Poland.
