= Jakubowskie =

- Village
- Location within Poland
- Coordinates: 52°40′N 23°1′E
- Country: Poland
- Voivodeship: Podlaskie
- County: Bielsk Podlaski
- Gmina: Boćki

Jakubowskie [jakuˈbɔfskʲɛ] is a village in the administrative district of Gmina Boćki, within Bielsk County, Podlaskie Voivodeship, in north-eastern Poland.
