= Michał Tymiński =

Polish Ruthenian Catholic priest (1740 – 1816~1824)

Michał Tymiński son of Grzegorz
- Born: c. 1740
- Died: Andryjanki, Bielsk County, Russian Empire
- Occupation: Priest
- Spouse: Katarzyna Tymińska
- Children: Bazyli, Józefiat, Tekla, Dominika, Jakub, Petronella

Michał Tymiński (born 1740; died ~ 1816-1824 Andryjanki) was an 18th-century Ruthenian Catholic (Greek Catholic/Uniate) priest of the Diocese of Volodymyr-Brest who served in the Bielsk region of Podlachia in the late Polish–Lithuanian Commonwealth.

== Biography ==
He was ordained to the priesthood on 17 November 1781 by Bishop Symeon Samuel Młocki, bishop of Volodymyr-Brest. Following his ordination, Tymiński served as vicar of the church in Andryjanki, in Bielsk County, from 17 November 1781 to 19 March 1784.

On 5 July 1793, he was presented to a benefice by pl:Franciszek Piotr Potocki, Starosta of Szczurowice, indicating his advancement within the ecclesiastical structure through noble patronage, a common practice in the late Commonwealth.

By 24 January 1796, he was serving as priest of the church in Andryjanki in the Bielsk district. A contemporary ecclesiastical evaluation described him as: “irreproachable in Ruthenian tradition and church law, sincere in conduct, and diligent in worship and the instruction of parishioners.”

This assessment reflects his standing within the diocesan clergy and suggests he was regarded as a competent and respected parish priest. He was the grandfather of Herman Tymiński, 2th great-grandfather of Brunon Tymiński, and the 3th great-grandfather of Danuta Siedzikówna and Wiesława Korzeń.

== Ministry ==
- 17 November 1781 Ordained priest
- 1781–1784 Vicar in Andrianki
- 5 July 1793 Presented to benefice
- 1796–1804 Parish priest in Andrianki

== Historical significance ==
Tymiński represents the provincial Uniate clergy of late eighteenth-century Podlachia, whose ecclesiastical careers were closely connected to both diocesan hierarchy and noble patronage networks.
