= Olszewo, Gmina Boćki =

Olszewo
- Village
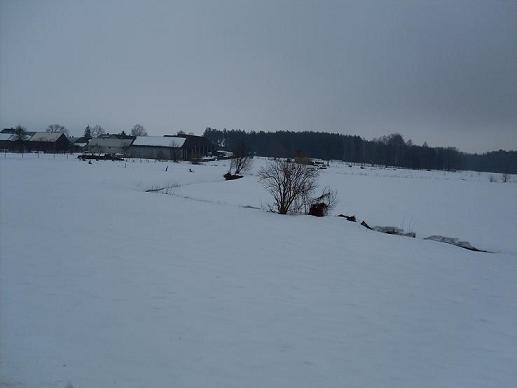
- During the winter in Olszewo

- Location within Poland
- Coordinates: 52°30′00″N 23°00′00″E
- Country: Poland
- Voivodeship: Podlaskie
- County: Bielsk
- Gmina: Boćki

Olszewo [ɔlˈʂɛvɔ] is a village in the administrative district of Gmina Boćki, within Bielsk County, Podlaskie Voivodeship, in north-eastern Poland.
