= Młynisk =

Settlement in Gmina Boćki, Poland

- Settlement
- Location within Poland
- Coordinates: 52°39′44.07″N 22°54′19.26″E
- Country: Poland
- Voivodeship: Podlaskie
- County: Bielsk
- Gmina: Boćki

Młynisk [ˈmwɨnisk] is a settlement in the administrative district of Gmina Boćki, within Bielsk County, Podlaskie Voivodeship, in north-eastern Poland.
