= Dubno, Podlaskie Voivodeship =

Dubno
- Village
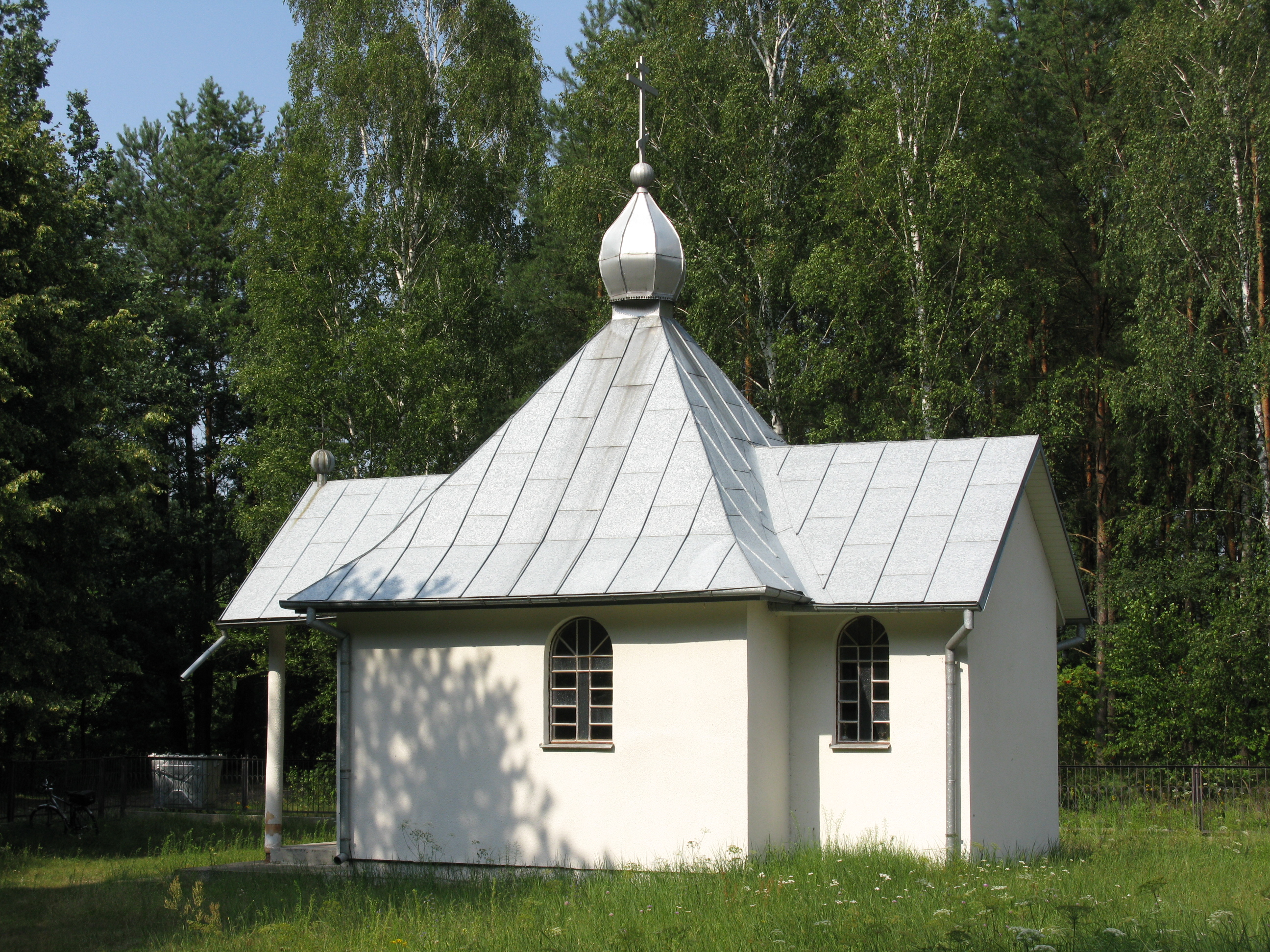
- Holy Myrrhbearers chapel in Dubno

- Location within Poland
- Coordinates: 52°38′N 23°7′E
- Country: Poland
- Voivodeship: Podlaskie
- County: Bielsk
- Gmina: Boćki
- Time zone: UTC+1 (CET)
  - Summer (DST): UTC+2 (CEST)

Dubno [ˈdubnɔ] is a village in the administrative district of Gmina Boćki, within Bielsk County, Podlaskie Voivodeship, in eastern Poland.

== History ==
In early 17th century, voivode Mikołaj Sapieha erected a mansion in Dubno with four steeples, utterly destroyed during the Swedish Deluge. In late 18th century, the Potocki family built there one of the first sugar refinery plants in Poland.

According to the 1921 census, the village was inhabited by 317 people, among whom 12 were Roman Catholic, 292 Orthodox, 9 Jewish and 4 different. At the same time, 10 inhabitants declared Polish nationality, 298 Belarusian and 9 Jewish. There were 31 residential buildings in the village.

Three Polish citizens were murdered by Nazi Germany in the village during World War II.
