= Marian Sanctuary in Różanystok =

Church in Różanystok, Poland

Coordinates: 53°38′01″N 23°24′13″E

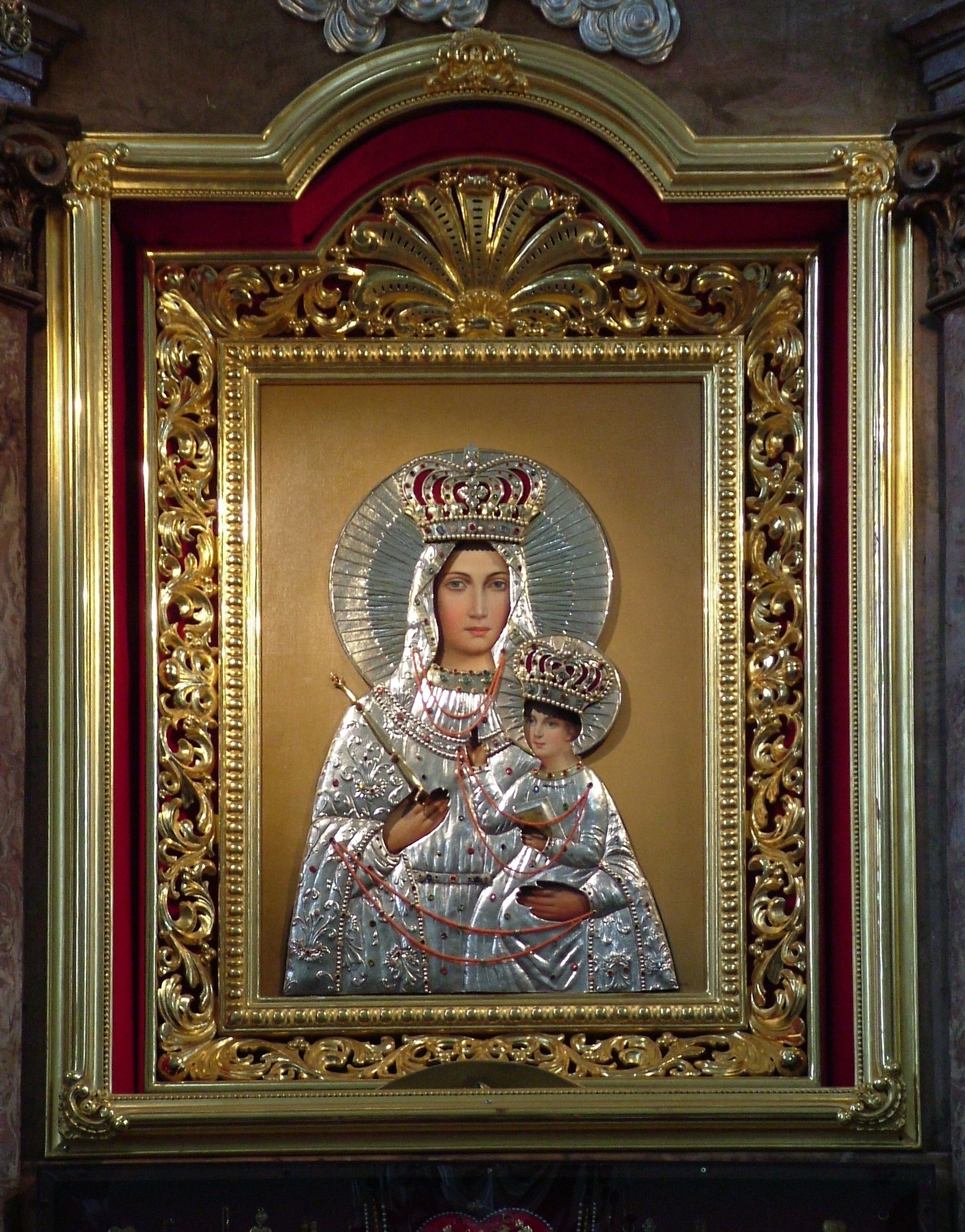
Painting of Our Lady of Różanystok, painted in 1929

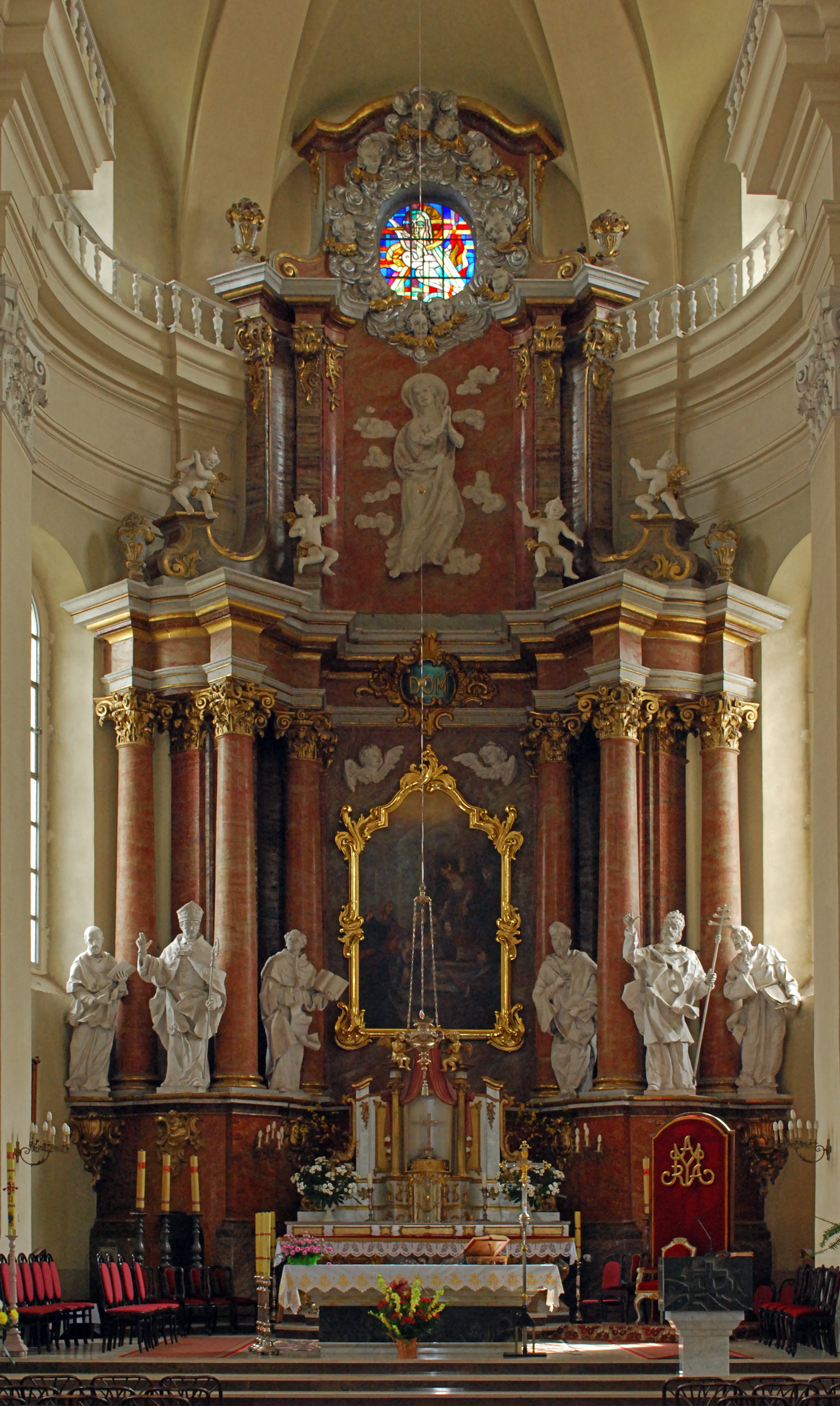
Main altar

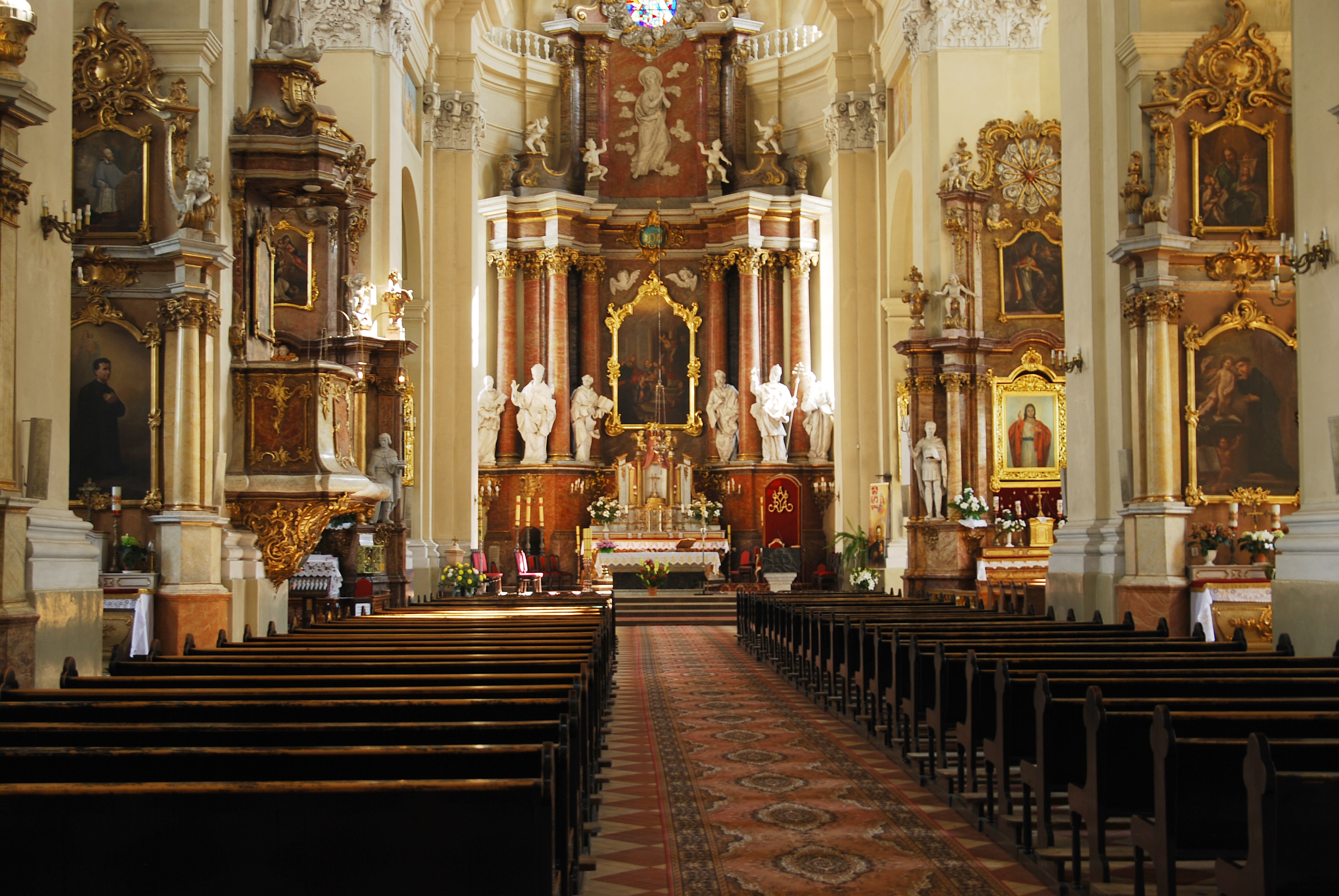
Interior of the basilica

The Marian Sanctuary in Różanystok is a Marian shrine operated by the Salesians in the village of Różanystok, located in a church modeled after the Jesuit church in Grodno.

== Architecture ==
The church has a three-nave layout and is built on the plan of a Latin cross. The presbytery faces south. The entire structure is Baroque in style, while the interior decoration and altars feature Rococo ornamental motifs.

== History ==
The sanctuary's history begins with a painting made in Grodno in 1652 by Jan Szretter, depicting the Virgin Mary holding the Child Jesus. The painting was acquired by landowner Szczęsny Tyszkiewicz of the Leliwa coat of arms and his wife Eufrozyna. It was placed in their bedroom, where the household would gather for prayer.

On November 21, 1658, during the Feast of the Presentation of Mary, extraordinary phenomena began: an oil lamp lighting by itself, dry wreaths blooming, and an unusual rose scent. Angelic singing and music were reportedly heard.

Due to the growing number of pilgrims, the image was transferred to a wooden church around 1660/1661. On November 21, 1662, during the Presentation feast, priest Wojsznarowicz consecrated the painting under the orders of Vilnius bishop Jerzy Białłozor. That year, a special commission was appointed to verify the miracles associated with the image, recognizing over 30 as genuine.

In 1663, the image was entrusted to the Dominicans from Sejny. Around that time, the village was renamed to Różanystok.

=== Timeline ===
- 1667 – Fr. Gabriel Jurkowski publishes a book on the miraculous painting
- 18th c. – The cult of the image spreads further through Dominican missions in Lithuania, Ruthenia, and the Crown
- 1759 – Construction of the new brick church begins
- 1785 – The new church is consecrated by Vilnius auxiliary bishop Tomasz Ignacy Zienkowicz
- 1794 – The monastery is completed; painter Antoni Gruszecki contributes artwork
- 1795 – Różanystok becomes part of the Prussian Partition
- 1807 – Incorporated into the Russian Partition after the Treaty of Tilsit
- 1811 – Archbishop Stanisław Bohusz Siestrzeńcewicz creates a parish, entrusted to the Dominicans
- 1846 – The Dominican monastery is suppressed by decree of Tsar Nicholas I
- 1861 – Patriotic-religious manifestation by locals
- 1866 – The church is closed by order of Tsar Alexander II and converted into an Orthodox church where Herman Tymiński served as a priest
- 1901 – Orthodox nuns from Grodno settle in the former monastery; they build the winter church of St. Sergius of Radonezh
- 1915 – The nuns flee to Russia with the miraculous icon; the site becomes a military barracks
- 1918 – The church is returned to Catholic clergy
- 1918 – Parish restored by Bishop Jerzy Matulewicz; Fr. Witold Sarosiek becomes the new pastor
- 1919 – Salesians arrive and start educational work
- 1922 – Salesian Sisters arrive from Italy
- 1923 – Apostolic Nuncio Lorenzo Lauri and his secretary (future Pope Paul VI) visit the sanctuary
- 1925 – Installation of 32-register pipe organ by Wacław Biernacki
- 1929 – A new painting of the Virgin is installed and blessed by Pope Pius XI
- 1929 – Visit by Cardinal August Hlond, Polish primate and Salesian, to lead the first investitures of Salesian Sisters in Poland
- 1939 – WWII interrupts activities; some buildings destroyed
- 1945 – The high school resumes operations
- 1949 – Establishment of a minor seminary for local dioceses
- 1954 – Communist authorities close the school and monastery; Salesians remain for pastoral duties only
- 1958/59 – Celebration of the 300th anniversary of the Marian cult
- 1959 – New vestments for the icon blessed by Archbishop Antoni Baraniak
- 1978 – Preparations for the coronation of the icon
- 1981 – Coronation ceremony led by Cardinal Franciszek Macharski, with Bishop Edward Kisiel and 250,000 faithful attending
- 1987 – The church is designated a Minor basilica
- 2000 – The sanctuary is designated a Jubilee indulgence site
- 2000 – Inauguration of the Salesian Youth House and Dormitory
- 2004 – Papal gifts presented to the Salesian community in the Apostolic Palace
- 2021 – New vestments for the icon of Our Lady of Różanostok

== Bibliography ==
- Kułak, Aneta. "The altar ensemble in the parish church in Różanystok – history and iconography". Conservation Bulletin of the Podlaskie Voivodeship. 2004 no. 10: 159–188. ISSN 1509-071X.
