= Chranibory Drugie =

- Settlement
- Location within Poland
- Coordinates: 52°37′44.27″N 23°04′53.93″E
- Country: Poland
- Voivodeship: Podlaskie
- County: Bielsk
- Gmina: Boćki

Chranibory Drugie [xraniˈbɔrɨ ˈdruɡʲɛ] is a settlement in the administrative district of Gmina Boćki, within Bielsk County, Podlaskie Voivodeship, in north-eastern Poland.
