= Mołoczki =

- Village
- Location within Poland
- Coordinates: 52°36′N 23°12′E
- Country: Poland
- Voivodeship: Podlaskie
- County: Bielsk
- Gmina: Boćki

Mołoczki [mɔˈwɔt͡ʂkʲi] is a village in the administrative district of Gmina Boćki, within Bielsk County, Podlaskie Voivodeship, in north-eastern Poland.
