= Siekluki, Podlaskie Voivodeship =

Siekluki
- Village
- Location within Poland
- Coordinates: 52°38′N 22°58′E
- Country: Poland
- Voivodeship: Podlaskie
- County: Bielsk
- Gmina: Boćki

Siekluki [ɕɛˈkluki] is a village in the administrative district of Gmina Boćki, within Bielsk County, Podlaskie Voivodeship, in north-eastern Poland.
