= Krasna Wieś =

- Village
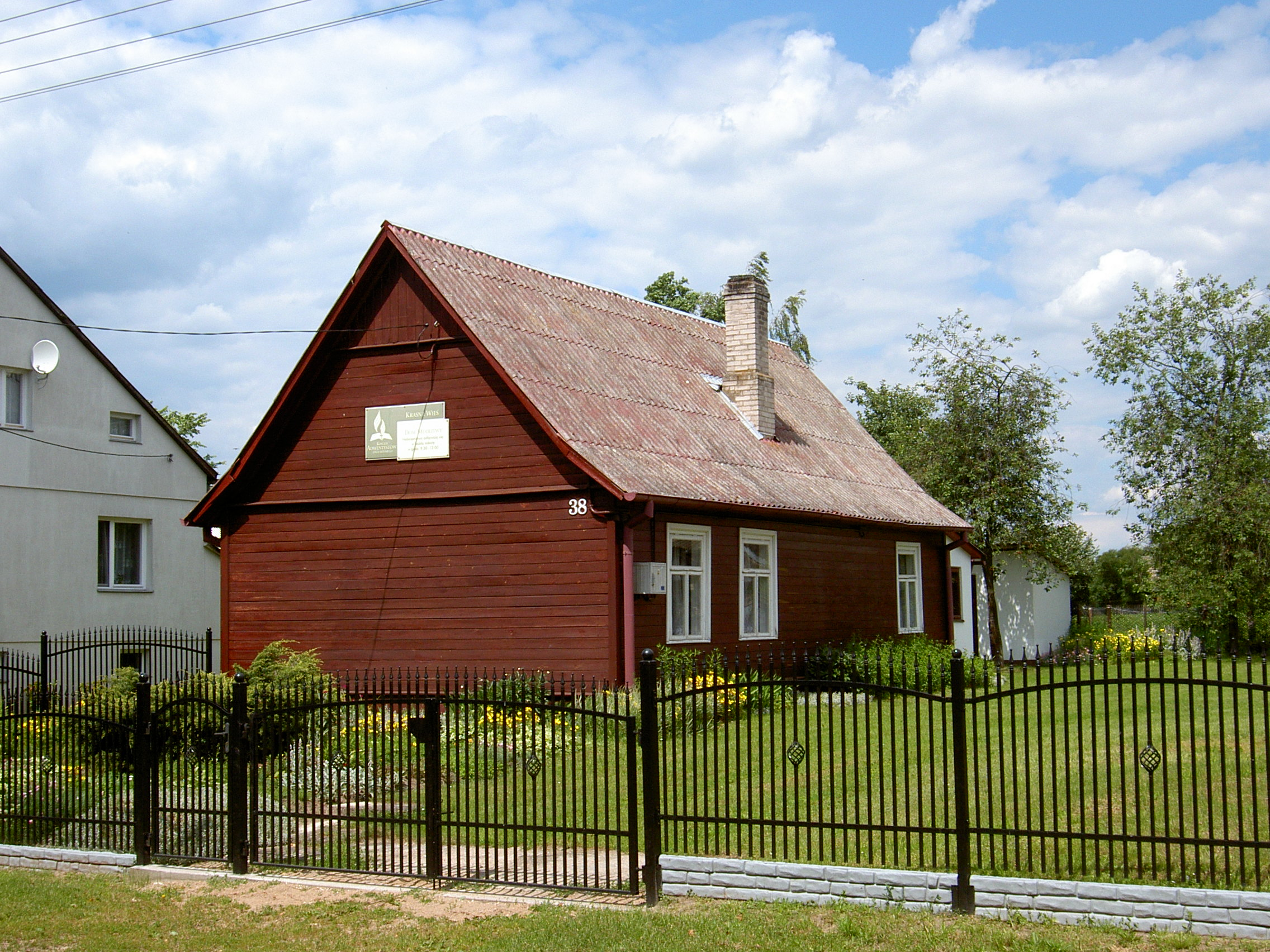
- Seventh-Day Adventist church in Krasna Wieś

- Location within Poland
- Coordinates: 52°39′N 23°10′E
- Country: Poland
- Voivodeship: Podlaskie
- County: Bielsk
- Gmina: Boćki
- Time zone: UTC+1 (CET)
  - Summer (DST): UTC+2 (CEST)
- Vehicle registration: BBI

Krasna Wieś [ˈkrasna ˈvʲɛɕ] (Belarusian: Краснае Сяло, Podlachian; Krásne Sełó, West Polesian: Красне Село) is a village in the administrative district of Gmina Boćki, within Bielsk County, Podlaskie Voivodeship, in north-eastern Poland.

Poland's sole Seventh-Day Adventist cemetery is located in the village.

According to the 1921 census, the village was inhabited by 352 people, among whom 60 were Roman Catholic, 273 Orthodox, 12 Jewish and 7 different. At the same time, 350 inhabitants declared Polish nationality, 2 Belarusian. There were 69 residential buildings in the village.
