= Gmina Boćki =

Gmina Boćki Boćki Commune
- Gmina
- Coat of arms

- Location within Poland
- Coordinates (Boćki): 52°39′N 23°2′E
- Country: Poland
- Voivodeship: Podlaskie
- County: Bielsk
- Seat: Boćki

Government
  - Mayor: Stanisław Derehajło

Area
  - Total: 232.06 km^{2} (89.60 sq mi)

Population (2007)
  - Total: 4,906
  - Density: 21.14/km^{2} (54.76/sq mi)
- Time zone: UTC+1 (CET)
  - Summer (DST): UTC+2 (CEST)
- Postal code: 17-111
- Car plates: BBI
- Website: http://www.gminabocki.pl

Gmina Boćki [ˈbɔt͡ɕkʲi] is a rural gmina (Polish:gmina wiejska) in Bielsk County, Podlaskie Voivodeship. It is located north-eastern Poland.

== Geography ==
Gmina Boćki is located in the geographical region of Europe known as the Wysoczyzny Podlasko – Bialoruskie (English: Podlaskie and Belarus Plateau) and the mezoregion known as the Równinę Bielską (English: Bielska Plain).

The Nurzec River, a tributary of the Bug River, passes through Gmina Boćki.

The gmina covers an area of 232.06 square kilometres (89.6 sq mi).

=== Location ===
It is located approximately:

- 152 kilometres (94.4 mi) north-east of Warsaw, the capital of Poland
- 53 kilometres (32.9 mi) south of Białystok, the capital of the Podlaskie Voivodeship
- 18 kilometres (11.2 mi) southwest of Bielsk Podlaski, the seat of Bielsk County

=== Climate ===
The region has a continental climate which is characterized by high temperatures during summer and long and frosty winters . The average amount of rainfall during the year exceeds 550 millimetres (21.7 in).

== Demographics ==
Detailed data as of 31 December 2007:

	Total		Women		Men	
Unit	Number	%	Number	%	Number	%
Population	4906	100	2,391	48.7	2,515	51.3
Population Density (persons/km²)	21.1		10.3		10.8	

== Municipal government ==
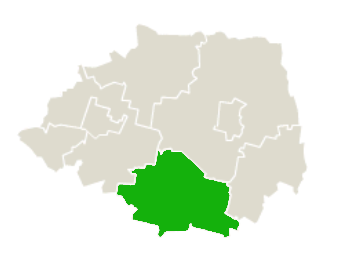
Gmina Boćki in Bielsk County

Its seat is the village of Boćki

=== Executive branch ===
The chief executive of the government is the mayor (Polish: wójt).

=== Legislative branch ===
The legislative portion of the government is the Council (Polish: Rada), composed of the President (Polish: Przewodniczący), the Vice President (Polish: Wiceprzewodniczący) and thirteen councilors.

=== Villages ===
The following villages are contained within the gmina:

Andryjanki, Boćki, Bodaczki, Bodaki, Bystre, Chranibory Drugie, Chranibory Pierwsze, Dubno, Dziecinne, Hawryłki, Jakubowskie, Krasna Wieś, Młynisk, Mołoczki, Nurzec, Olszewo, Pasieka, Piotrowo-Krzywokoły, Piotrowo-Trojany, Przy Ostaszach, Sasiny, Siedlece, Siekluki, Sielc, Skalimowo, Solniki, Starowieś, Szeszyły, Szumki, Śnieżki, Torule, Wandalin, Wandalinek, Wiercień, Wojtki, Wygonowo, Wylan, Żołoćki.

=== Neighbouring political subdivisions ===
Gmina Boćki is bordered by the gminas of Bielsk Podlaski, Brańsk, Dziadkowice, Kleszczele, Milejczyce and Orla.
