= Starowieś =

- Village
- Location within Poland
- Coordinates: 52°42′N 23°5′E
- Country: Poland
- Voivodeship: Podlaskie
- County: Bielsk
- Gmina: Boćki

Starowieś [staˈrɔvʲɛɕ] is a village in the administrative district of Gmina Boćki, within Bielsk County, Podlaskie Voivodeship, in north-eastern Poland.
