= Wygonowo =

- Village
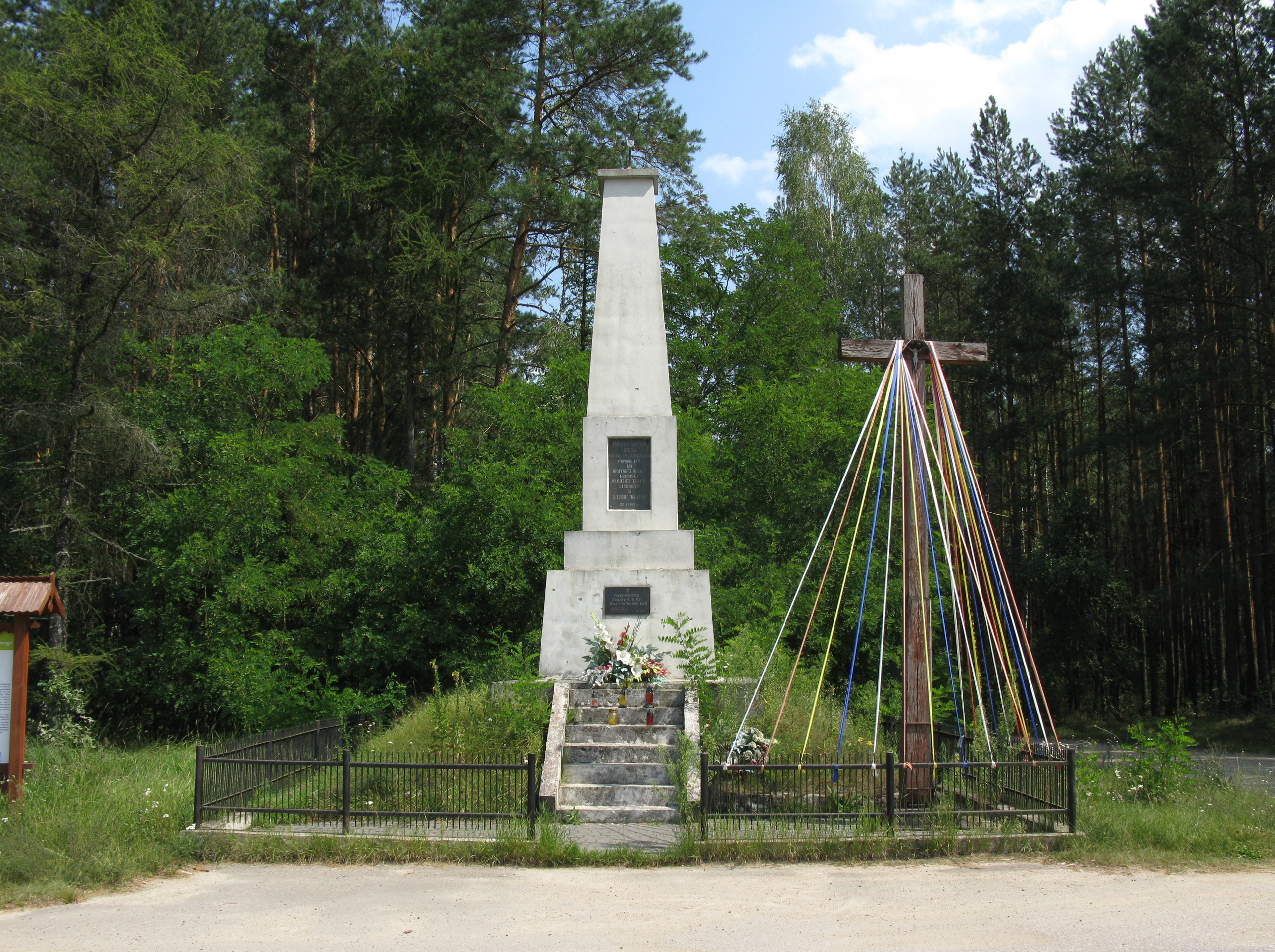

- Location within Poland
- Coordinates: 52°36′N 23°0′E
- Country: Poland
- Voivodeship: Podlaskie
- County: Bielsk
- Gmina: Boćki
- Time zone: UTC+1 (CET)
  - Summer (DST): UTC+2 (CEST)

Wygonowo [vɨɡɔˈnɔvɔ] is a village in the administrative district of Gmina Boćki, within Bielsk County, Podlaskie Voivodeship, in eastern Poland.

== History ==
According to the 1921 census, the village was inhabited by 267 people, among whom 245 were Roman Catholic, 17 Orthodox, and 5 Jewish. At the same time, 264 inhabitants declared Polish nationality, 3 Belarusian. There were 50 residential buildings in the village.

Three Polish citizens were murdered by Nazi Germany in the village during World War II.
