= Bystre, Podlaskie Voivodeship =

Bystre
- Village
- Location within Poland
- Coordinates: 52°35′5″N 23°6′58″E
- Country: Poland
- Voivodeship: Podlaskie
- County: Bielsk
- Gmina: Boćki

Population
  - Total: 150
- Time zone: UTC+1 (CET)
  - Summer (DST): UTC+2 (CEST)

Bystre [ˈbɨstrɛ] is a village in the administrative district of Gmina Boćki, within Bielsk County, Podlaskie Voivodeship, in eastern Poland.

== History ==
Three Polish citizens were murdered by Nazi Germany in the village during World War II.
