= Chranibory Pierwsze =

- Settlement
- Location within Poland
- Coordinates: 52°37′35.93″N 23°04′08.07″E
- Country: Poland
- Voivodeship: Podlaskie
- County: Bielsk
- Gmina: Boćki

Chranibory Pierwsze [xraniˈbɔrɨ ˈpjɛrfʂɛ] is a settlement in the administrative district of Gmina Boćki, within Bielsk County, Podlaskie Voivodeship, in north-eastern Poland.
