= Nurzec, Bielsk County =

Nurzec
- Village
- Location within Poland
- Coordinates: 52°37′N 23°8′E
- Country: Poland
- Voivodeship: Podlaskie
- County: Bielsk
- Gmina: Boćki

Nurzec [ˈnuʐɛt͡s] is a village in the administrative district of Gmina Boćki, within Bielsk County, Podlaskie Voivodeship, in north-eastern Poland.
