= Piotrowo-Krzywokoły =

- Village
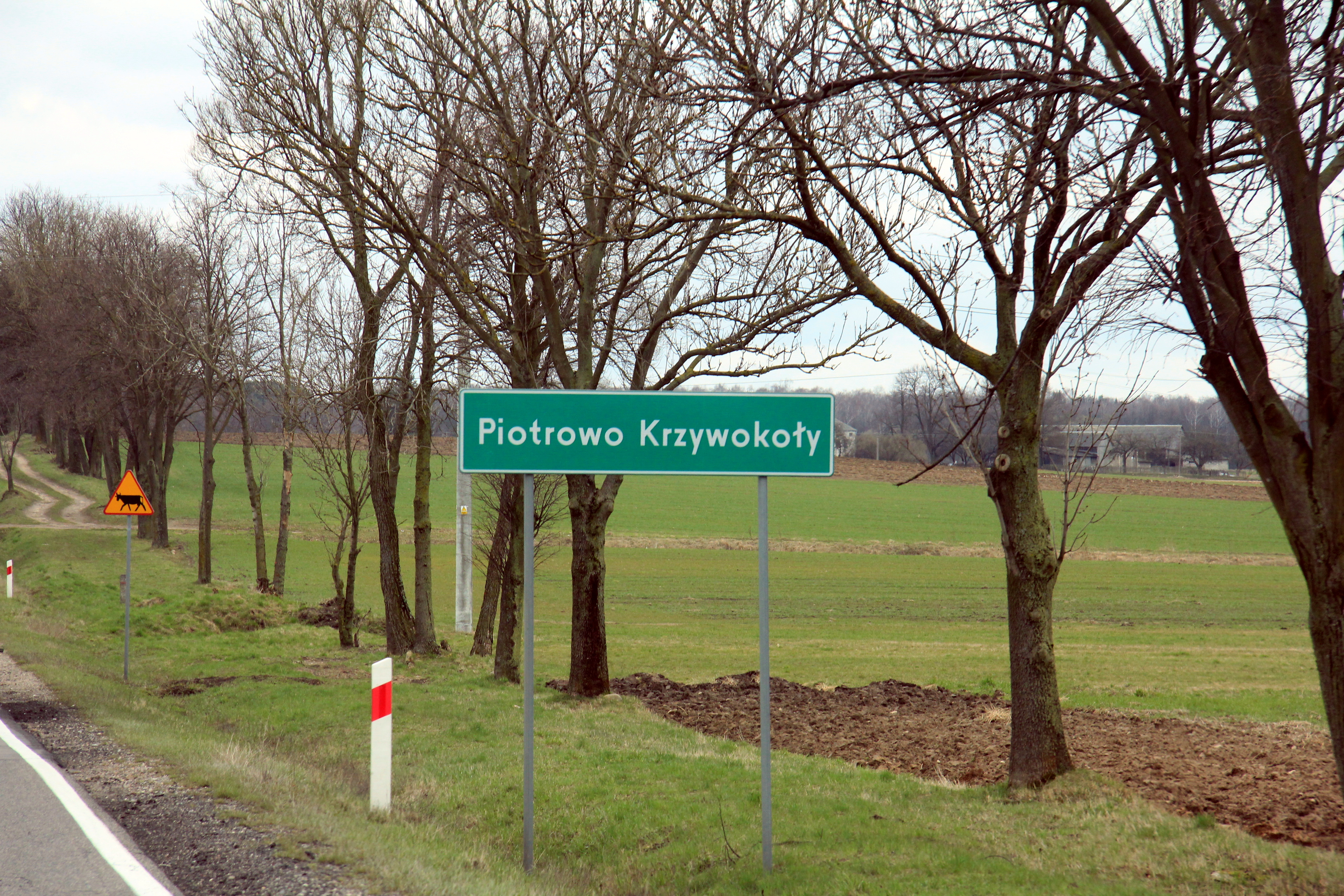

- Location within Poland
- Coordinates: 52°35′59″N 22°58′22″E
- Country: Poland
- Voivodeship: Podlaskie
- County: Bielsk
- Gmina: Boćki

Piotrowo-Krzywokoły [pjɔˈtrɔvɔ kʂɨvɔˈkɔwɨ] is a village in the administrative district of Gmina Boćki, within Bielsk County, Podlaskie Voivodeship, in north-eastern Poland.
