= Wandalin, Podlaskie Voivodeship =

Wandalin
- Village
- Location within Poland
- Coordinates: 52°36′2″N 23°2′59″E
- Country: Poland
- Voivodeship: Podlaskie
- County: Bielsk
- Gmina: Boćki

Wandalin [vanˈdalin] is a village in the administrative district of Gmina Boćki, within Bielsk County, Podlaskie Voivodeship, in north-eastern Poland.
