= Wandalinek =

- Village
- Location within Poland
- Coordinates: 52°36′8″N 23°2′29″E
- Country: Poland
- Voivodeship: Podlaskie
- County: Bielsk
- Gmina: Boćki

Wandalinek [vandaˈlinɛk] is a village in the administrative district of Gmina Boćki, within Bielsk County, Podlaskie Voivodeship, in northeastern Poland.
