= Łasza =

Village in Grodno, Belarus

Łasza Лаша Лаша
- Village
- Interactive map of Łasza
- Coordinates: 53°28′35″N 23°58′27″E
- Country: BY‑HR
- Region: Grodno Region
- Indura: Indura

Population (2004)
  - Total: 219

Łasza (Belarusian: Лаша; Russian: Лаша, romanized: Łasza; Polish: Łasza) is a village in Indura Selsoviet Grodno District, Grodno Region, Belarus.

It is the seat of an Orthodox parish, and there is the Church of St Nicholas the Wonderworker.

== History ==
Formerly a village in Grodno County, Trakai Voivodeship, of the Polish–Lithuanian Commonwealth.

During the partitions it lay within the Russian Empire, in Grodno Governorate, Grodno County.

Between 1921 and 1939 the village was in Poland, in Białystok Voivodeship, Grodno County, in Łasza Gmina.

According to the 1921 Polish census, the village had 496 inhabitants: 3 Roman Catholic and 493 Orthodox. Eight declared Polish nationality and 488 Belarusian. There were 87 residential buildings.

The locality belonged to the Orthodox parish in Indura and the Roman Catholic parish in Kwasówka. It fell under the Grodno District Court in Indura and the Regional Court in Grodno; the post office was located in Kwasówka.

In the aftermath of the Soviet invasion of Poland in September 1939 the village came under Soviet occupation. 2 November it was attached to the Belarusian SSR. On 4 December 1939 it was included in the newly created Białystok Oblast of the USSR. From June 1941 it was under German occupation and from 22 July 1941 incorporated into the Bezirk Bialystok of Nazi Germany. In 1944 the village was retaken by Soviet forces and reintegrated into Grodno Region of the Belarusian SSR.

== Bibliography ==
- Stanisław Kutrzeba: History of the political system of Poland in outline, Volume II: Lithuania. Lviv & Warsaw: 1921.
- Sienkiewicz, Witold; Olczak, Elżbieta (2007). History of Poland: Illustrative Atlas. Warsaw: Demart SA. ISBN 978-83-7427-363-3.
