= Sasiny, Gmina Boćki =

Sasiny
- Village
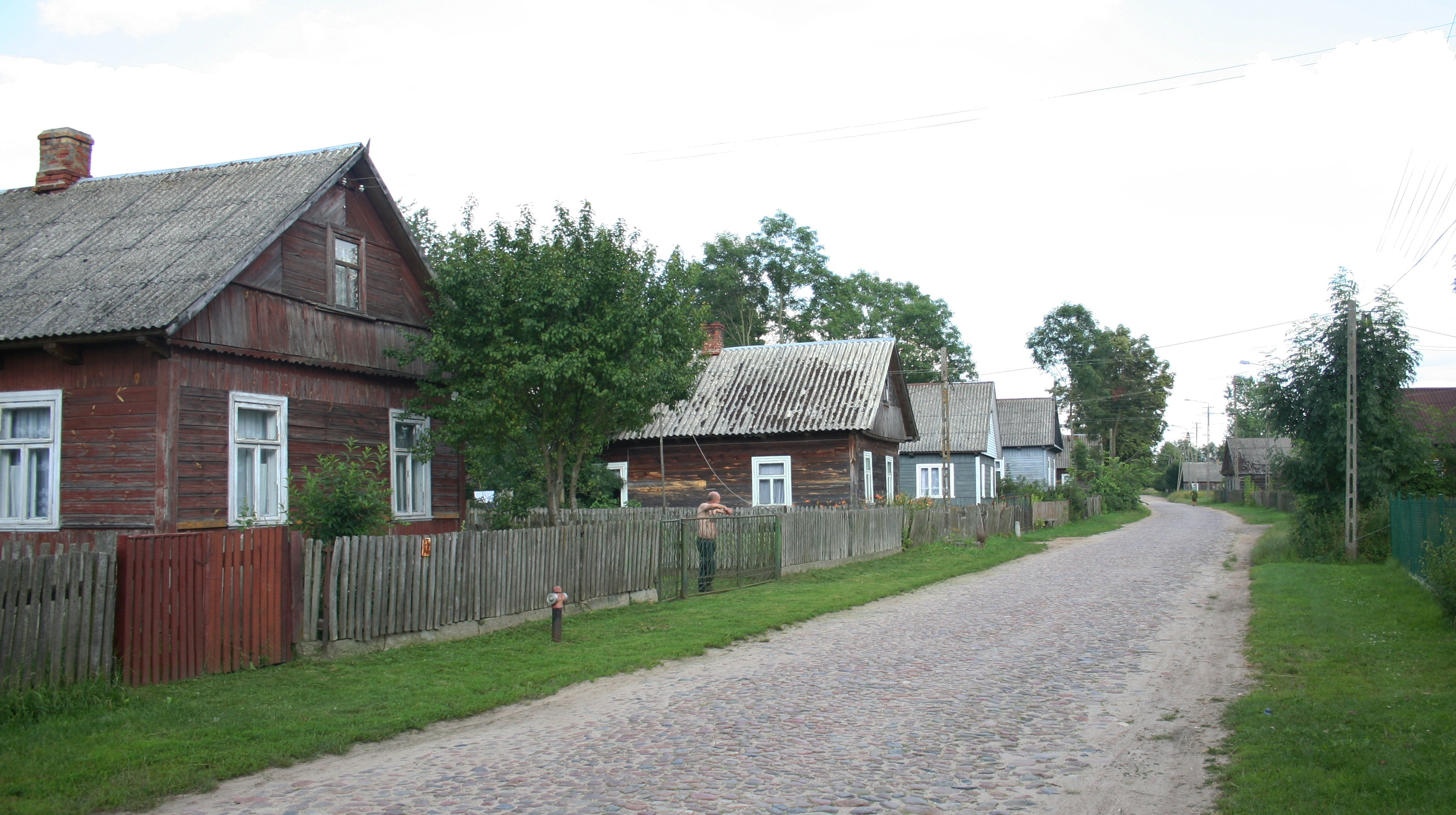
- Road in Sasiny

- Location within Poland
- Coordinates: 52°35′29.68″N 23°09′52.25″E
- Country: Poland
- Voivodeship: Podlaskie
- County: Bielsk
- Gmina: Boćki

Sasiny [saˈɕinɨ] is a village in the administrative district of Gmina Boćki, within Bielsk County, Podlaskie Voivodeship, in north-eastern Poland.

According to the 1921 census, the village was inhabited by 132 people, among whom 18 were Roman Catholic, 107 Orthodox, and 1 Mosaic. At the same time, 72 inhabitants declared Polish nationality, 53 Belarusian and 7 Jewish. There were 25 residential buildings in the village.
