= Różanystok =

- Village
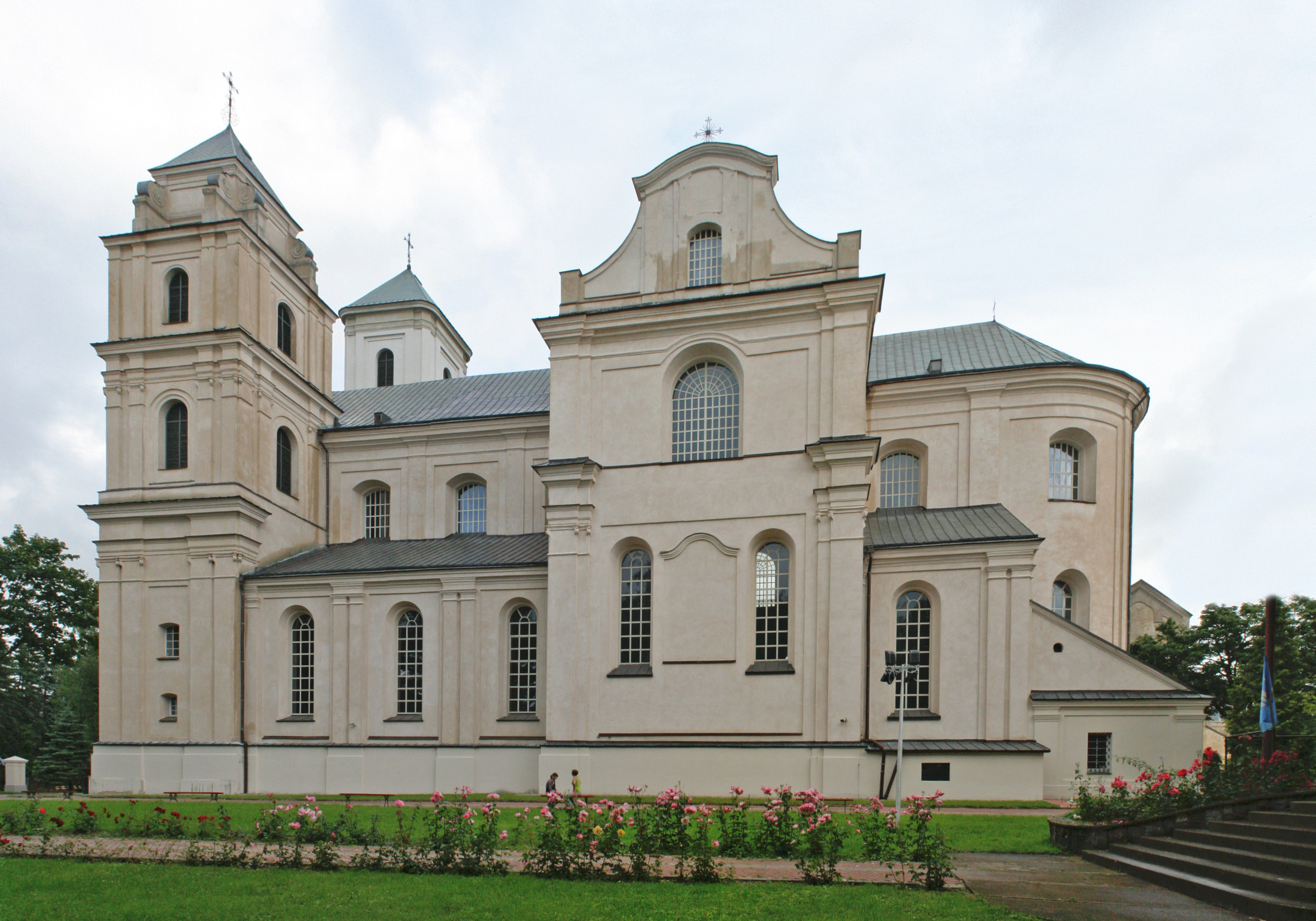
- Marian Sanctuary in Różanystok

- Location within Poland
- Coordinates: 53°38′05″N 23°24′16″E
- Country: Poland
- Voivodeship: Podlaskie
- County: Sokółka
- Gmina: Dąbrowa Białostocka

Population
  - Total: 510
- Time zone: UTC+1 (CET)
  - Summer (DST): UTC+2 (CEST)
- Postal code: 16-200
- Vehicle registration: BSK

Różanystok [ruʐaˈnɨstɔk] is a village and former monastery in northeastern Poland, known regionally for both its ornate 18th-century minor basilica and its agricultural magnet school.

== Geography ==
Różanystok, formerly known as Krzywy Stok ("Crooked Slope"), is located in the township of Dąbrowa Białostocka, which is in turn situated in the Podlaskie region's Sokółka County division. From the years 1975-1998 the area was part of the Białystok Voivodeship (1975-1998) administrative district. The Belarusian city of Grodno can be seen from the Basilica's bell tower. In 19th-century Russian documents (e.g. in the records of the Grodno Governorate), this name may appear as “Краснысток” — a form corresponding to the Polish “Różanystok” (in East Slavic languages:„Красный” = red, сток” = slope (though as a toponym it may be a phonetic adaptation of the Polish suffix –stok)).

== History ==
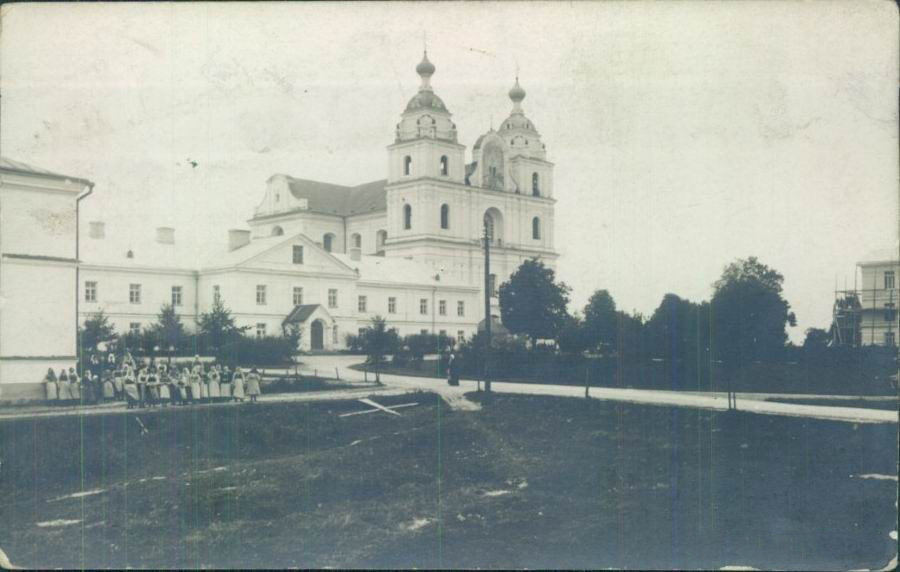
Sanctuary before 1915

The village is home to a well-known Mary, Mother of God shrine, to which tens of thousands of pilgrims travel each year. The shrine's focus is a 17th-century image of Mary holding the infant Jesus which is believed to be miraculous. A "coronation" celebration for the Różanystok icon was held on June 28, 1981, and the church was named a minor basilica on August 30, 1987.

According to the 1921 census, Różanystok had a population of 96, 95.8% Polish.

Following the German-Soviet invasion of Poland, which started World War II in September 1939, the village was occupied by the Soviet Union until 1941, and then by Germany until 1944. Two Polish citizens were murdered by Nazi Germany in the village during the war.

The church complex was used as a military storage depot during World War I, and several of its buildings were destroyed in World War II.

Since 1954, Różanystok has also been the location of a state-run Zespól Szkól Rolniczych (Group Agricultural School). The school's five-year technical program prepares students for work in agriculture and related fields, while its four-year economics program prepares students for work in business and/or advanced studies at the university level.

== Demographics ==
Most of Różanystok's 510 residents, who primarily live in two three-story apartment buildings within the village, attend, work at, or are retired from employment at the school.

== Images ==
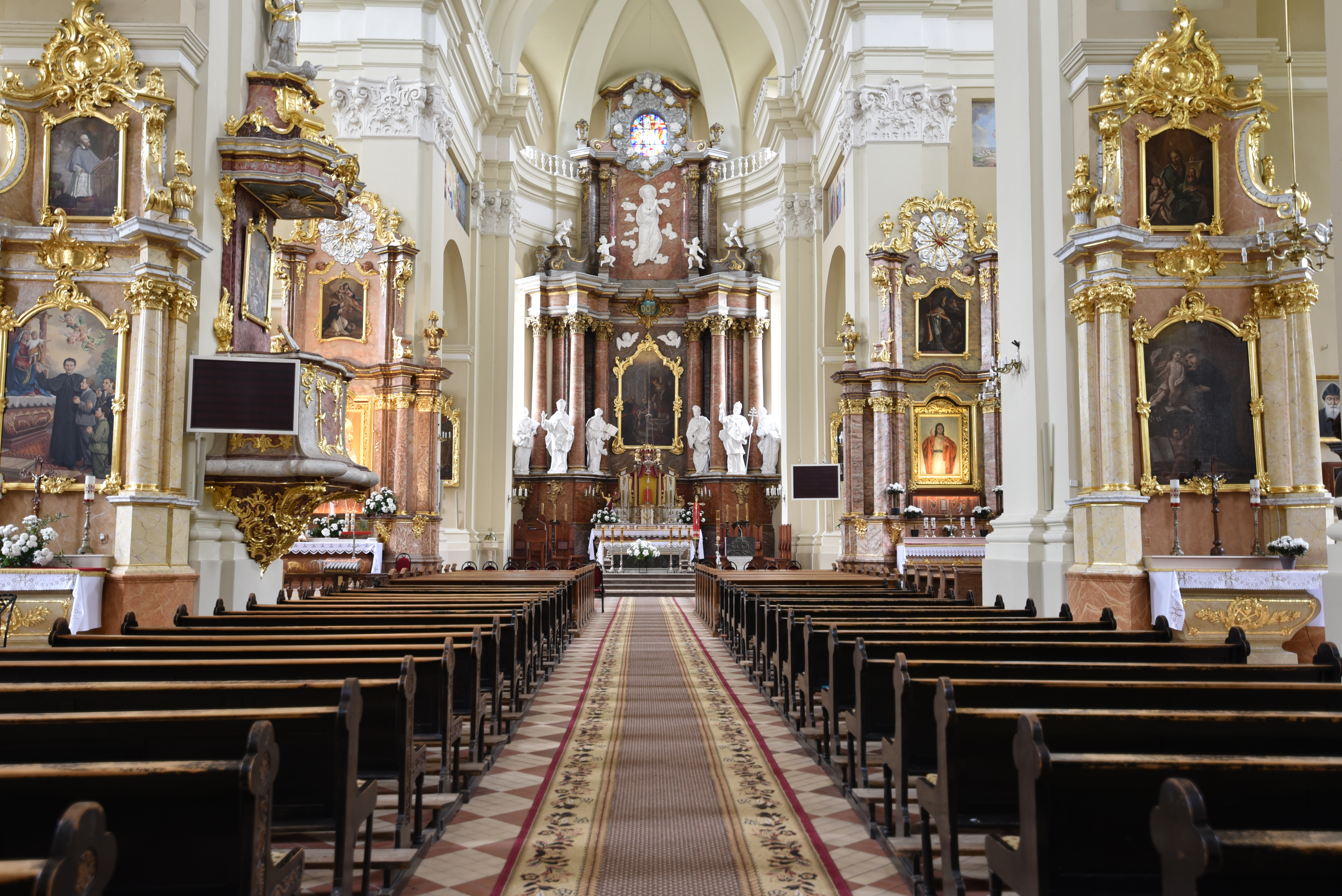
Sanctuary interior

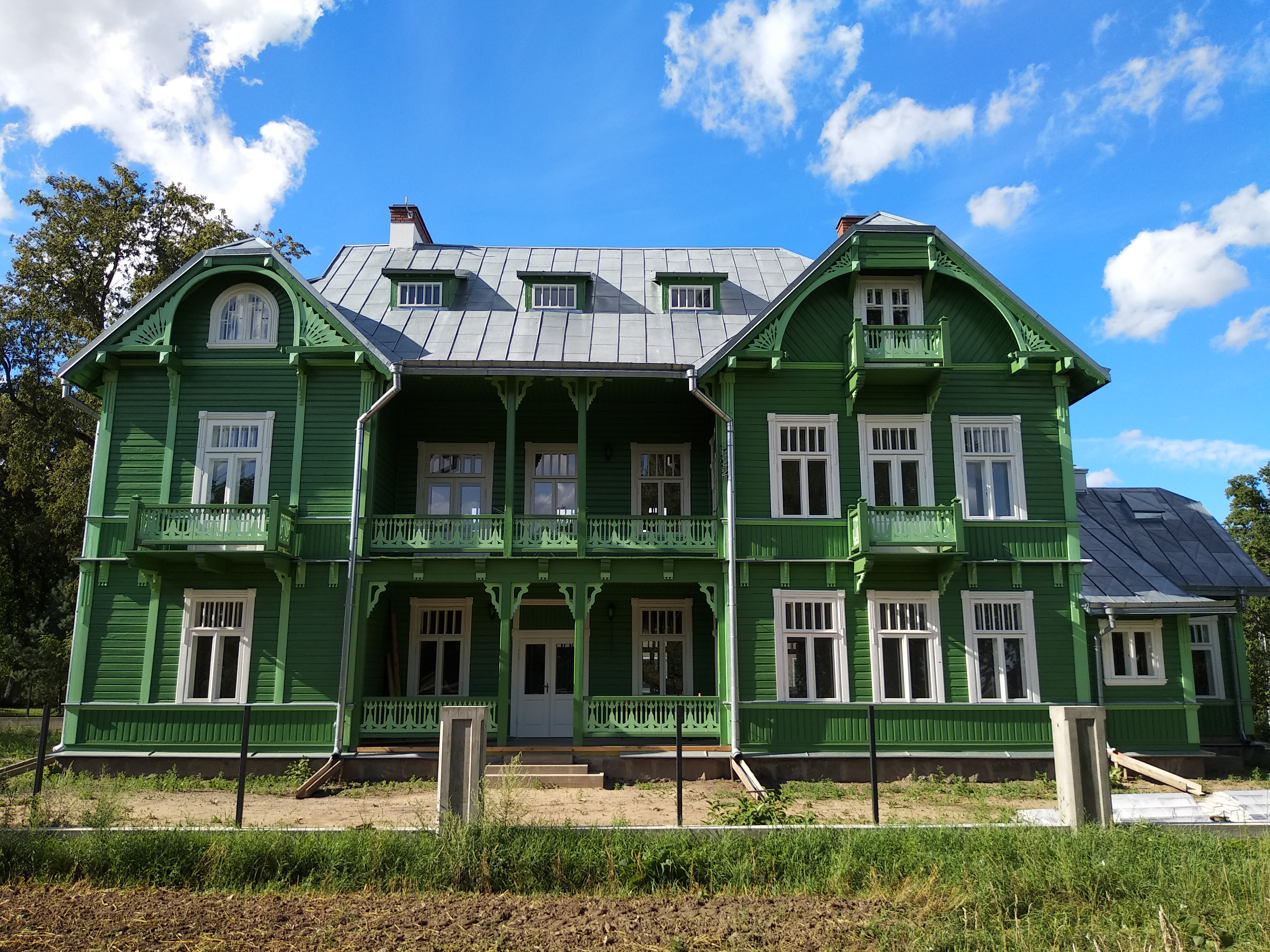
Zielona Dacza, historic wooden villa

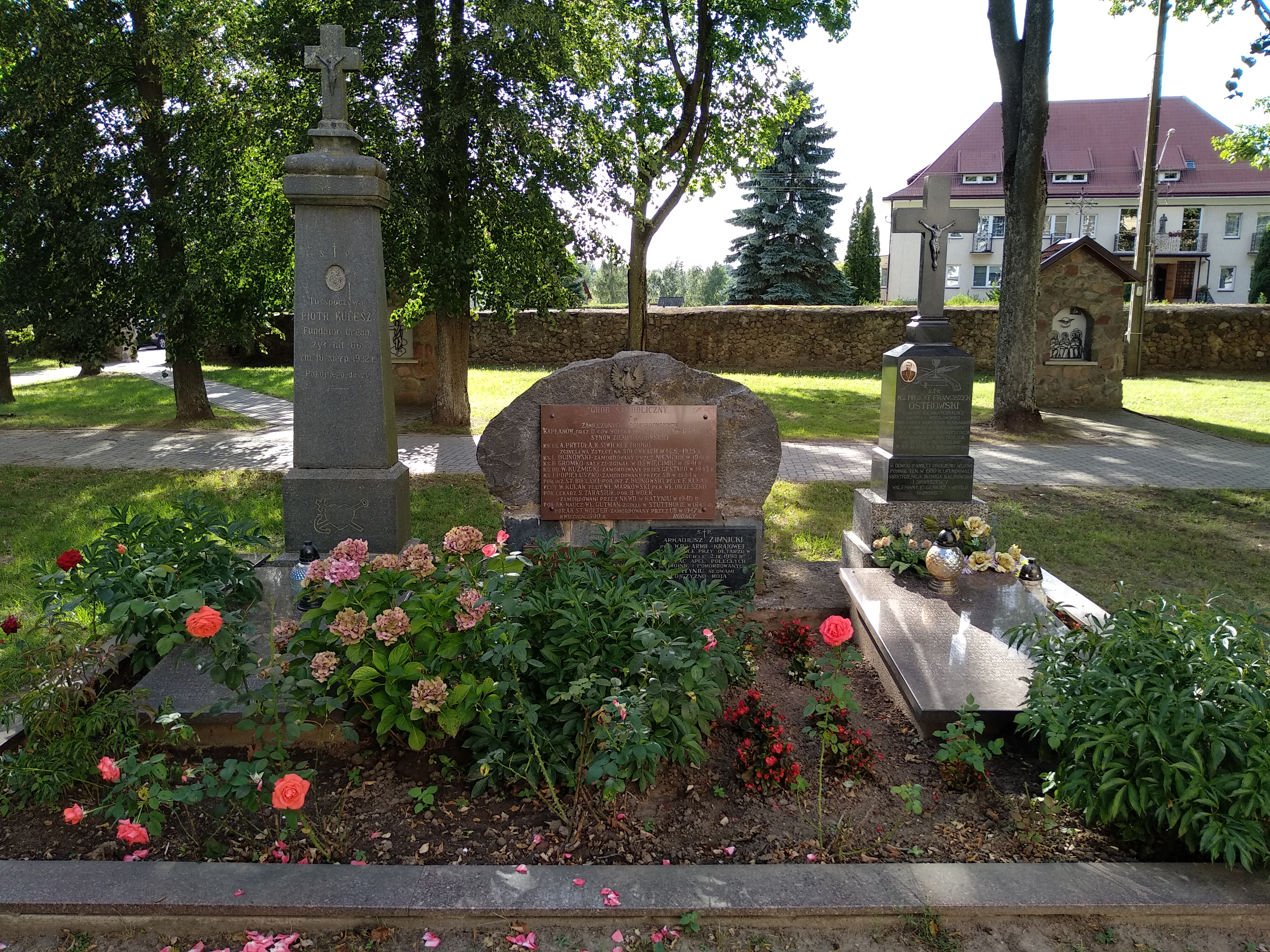
Memorial to victims of Nazis and Communists
