= Boćki =

- Village
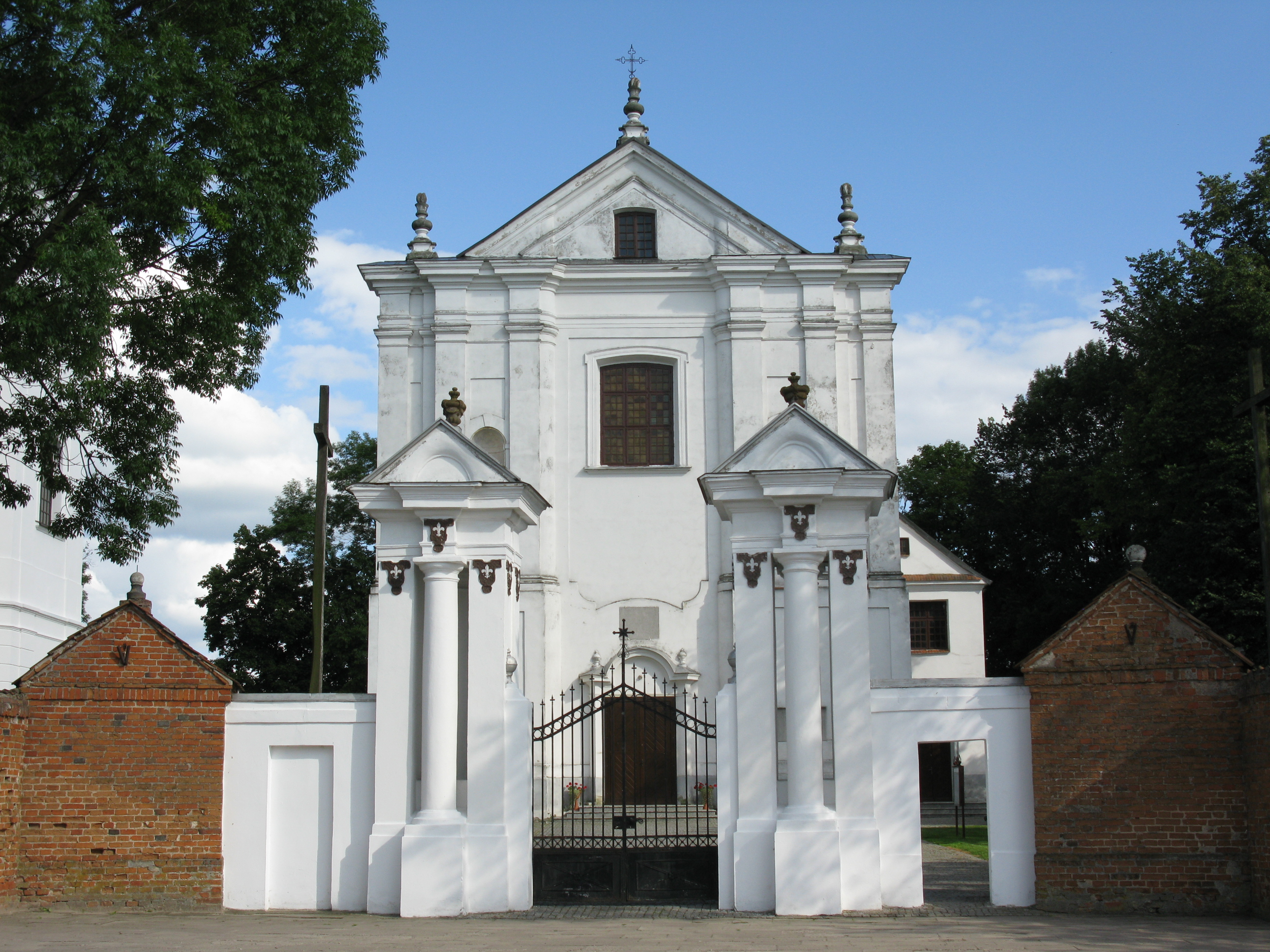
- Church of Saints Joseph and Anthony

- Location within Poland
- Coordinates: 52°39′N 23°2′E
- Country: Poland
- Voivodeship: Podlaskie
- County: Bielsk
- Gmina: Boćki

Population
  - Total: 1,500
- Time zone: UTC+1 (CET)
  - Summer (DST): UTC+2 (CEST)

Boćki [ˈbɔt͡ɕkʲi] is a village in Bielsk County, Podlaskie Voivodeship, in north-eastern Poland. It is the seat of the gmina (administrative district) called Gmina Boćki.

== History ==
It was a private town, administratively located in the Bielsk County in the Podlaskie Voivodeship in the Lesser Poland Province of the Kingdom of Poland.

According to the 1921 census, the village was inhabited by 1,719 people, among whom 744 were Roman Catholic, 239 Orthodox, 11 Evangelical and 725 Jewish. At the same time, 1,065 inhabitants declared Polish nationality, 44 Belarusian, 2 Russian and 608 Jewish. There were 305 residential buildings in the village at the time.

Following the German-Soviet invasion of Poland, which started World War II in September 1939, the town was occupied by the Soviet Union until 1941, and then by Nazi Germany until 1944.

== Transport ==
The S19 expressway currently terminates just to the east of Boćki. The continuation of the expressway south to Chlebczyn is currently under construction.

The nearest railway station is in Bielsk Podlaski.

== Sights ==
There is an 18th-century Orthodox Church of Intercession of the Theotokos located there. It suffered significant damage during World War II when both towers and the roof collapsed due to German shelling. In 1943, it was provisionally reconstructed. The original appearance of the building was restored during a comprehensive renovation between 1999 and 2002. It is the only brick Orthodox church with two towers in the Podlachia region.
