= Andryjanki =

- Village
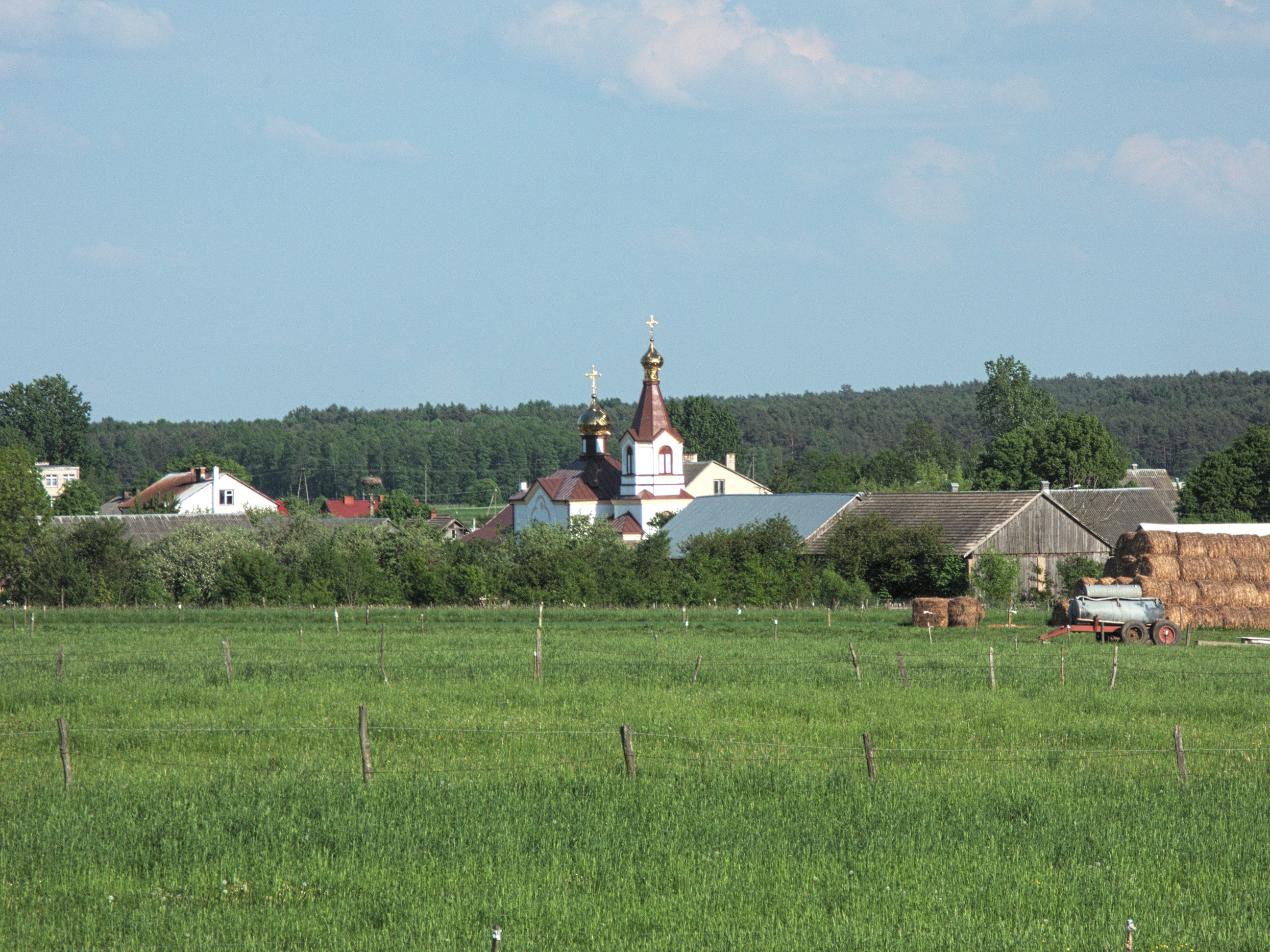

- Location within Poland
- Coordinates: 52°37′N 23°0′E
- Country: Poland
- Voivodeship: Podlaskie
- County: Bielsk
- Gmina: Boćki

Andryjanki [andrɨˈjaŋki] (Belarusian: Андрыянкі) is a village in the administrative district of Gmina Boćki, within Bielsk County, Podlaskie Voivodeship, in north-eastern Poland.

According to the 1921 census, the village was inhabited by 287 people, among whom 82 were Roman Catholic, 201 Orthodox, and 4 Mosaic. At the same time, 152 inhabitants declared Polish nationality, 135 Belarusian. There were 51 residential buildings in the village.

== History ==
- c. 1505–1508: The first known owner of Andryjanki (then called Andrijancziczi) was Prince Michał Gliński, court marshal of King Alexander Jagiellon. Accused of treason, he fled to Moscow in 1508 and lost his estates to the crown.
- 1517: King Sigismund I the Old granted the land to Abraham Józefowicz, royal treasurer.
- 1519: Józefowicz sold the estate to Andrzej Falkowicz (Falk), royal courtier and later Starost of Drohiczyn.
- 1557: After Falkowicz's death, the estate was divided among his daughters: Barbara (married Stanisław Falczewski), Marussa (married Michał Sapieha), Helena (married Andrzej Bobrownicki)
- 1569–1606: Estate split between the Falczewski and Sapieha branches. Eventually, parts came under the control of Andrzej Sapieha, and later Eleonora Sapieha Szyszkowska.
- 1655–1665: Transferred to Jan Sapieha, then passed to his son Paweł Jan Sapieha, and later to Franciszek Stefan Sapieha, and in 1686 to Józef Franciszek Sapieha.
- c. 1745–1752: After the death of Józef Franciszek Sapieha, ownership passed to his daughter Teresa Sapieżanka, who married fr:Joachim Karol Potocki from Potocki family in 1752.
- 1778: Their daughter Krystyna Potocka inherited the estate. She married Franciszek Piotr Potocki (1745–1829), Starost of Szczerzec.
- c. 1808: Estate passed to their son Jan Alojzy Potocki (1776–1854). His wife Antonina de Lusignan sold part of the estate in 1847 to Florentyna and Jan Gartkiewicz.
- 1862–1907: After Jan’s death, his children Andrzej Konstanty and Maria Roniker inherited the estate. Andrzej Konstanty became the sole owner in 1876 and expanded the buildings.
- 1907–1939: The estate passed to his widow Wanda and son Jan Rafał Gartkiewicz, and later to his grandson Stanisław Gartkiewicz.
- 1939–1944: During Soviet occupation, the Gartkiewicz family was deported to Siberia. The manor was damaged, and the estate was confiscated during the 1944 land reform.
- Post-WWII–1990s: The estate was nationalized, buildings deteriorated, and most structures were demolished.
- 1996: Edward Sieciński purchased the ruins with 8 hectares from the State Agricultural Agency and began restoration of the manor and park.
