= Koskinen =

- Language: Finnish

Origin
- Meaning: derived from koski ("rapids, whitewater")
- Region of origin: Finland

Koskinen is a surname of Virtanen type originating in Finland (in Finnish, koski means "rapids"), where it is the ninth most common surname. Notable people with the surname include:

- Albert Koskinen (1925–2004), Finnish athlete
- Antti Koskinen, multiple people
- Artturi Koskinen (1904–1981), Finnish smallholder and politician
- August Koskinen (1878–1949), Finnish carpenter and politician
- Erkki Koskinen (1925–2009), Finnish cyclist
- Frans Koskinen (1869–1918), Finnish journalist and politician
- Hannele Koskinen, Finnish figure skater
- Hannu Koskinen (born 1953), Finnish ice hockey player
- Harri Koskinen (born 1970), Finnish designer
- Heikki Koskinen (born 1930), Finnish chess master
- Helvi Koskinen (1930–1990), Finnish politician
- Jari Koskinen (born 1960), Finnish politician, Minister for Agriculture and Forestry of Finland
- Johannes Koskinen (born 1954), Finnish politician (M.P., Minister of Justice)
- John Koskinen (born 1939), American former U.S. Commissioner of Internal Revenue and former president of the U.S. Soccer Foundation
- Joonas Koskinen (born 1987), Finnish ice hockey player
- Jukka Koskinen (born 1982), Finnish musician (bassist for Norther, Wintersun)
- Jukka Koskinen (footballer) (born 1972), Finnish football (soccer) player
- Kaarina Koskinen (born 1944), Finnish gymnast
- Kalle Koskinen (born 1972), Finnish ice hockey player
- Kerkko Koskinen (born 1973), Finnish musician
- Kimmo Koskinen (born 1948), Finnish speed skater
- Kirsimarja Koskinen (born 1969), Finnish taekwondo practitioner
- Lennart Koskinen (born 1944), clergyman in the Church of Sweden, serving as bishop in Visby
- Luanne Koskinen (born 1940), American politician
- Lyyli Koskinen (1919–1969), Finnish politician
- Martta Koskinen (1896–1943), Finnish seamstress and communist
- Mikko Koskinen (born 1988), Finnish hockey player for the Edmonton Oilers of the National Hockey League
- Niki Koskinen (born 1997), Finnish ice hockey player
- Otso Koskinen (born 2003), Finnish footballer
- Pasi Koskinen (born 1972), Finnish vocalist (Amorphis)
- Pentti Koskinen (1943–2023), Finnish diver
- Petri Koskinen (born 1983), Finnish ice hockey player
- Riina Koskinen (born 1997), Finnish squash player
- Rolf Koskinen (1939–2010), Finnish orienteering competitor, European champion
- Sampo Koskinen (born 1979), Finnish football (soccer) player
- Sauli Koskinen (born 1985), Finnish TV/radio personality and entertainment reporter
- Tapio Koskinen (born 1953), Finnish ice hockey player
- Timo Koskinen, Finnish pianist
- Yrjö Sakari Yrjö-Koskinen (1830–1903), Finnish politician (senator, Finnish Party), professor, historian

== See also ==
- Koskinen, a Finnish crime drama television series
- Koskinen Stadium, a lacrosse and soccer stadium on the campus of Duke University, named for John Koskinen
- Koski
- Koskela
