= Bielsk Podlaski District (Home Army) =

Bielsk Podlaski District of the Home Army
- Obwód Bielsk Podlaski
- Active: 1939-1945
- Allegiance: Second Polish Republic
- Branch: Home Army
- Type: Underground
- Part of: Podlaski Inspectorate
- Garrison/HQ: Bielsk Podlaski
- Engagements: World War II

The Bielsk Podlaski district (Polish: Obwód Bielsk Podlaski was a sub-unit of the Home Army which covered the area between the Bug and the Narew rivers, bordering: to the north along the Narew river with the Białystok district, to the east through the Białowieża Forest with the Pruzhany district, to the south along the Bug river, to the northwest with the Sokołów County of the Warsaw Voivodeship and to the northwest with the Wysokie Mazowieckie County through the Gmina Ciechanowiec and Gmina Topczewo.

== History ==
Clandestine activity in the Bielsk County began as early as 1939. The complex relations with the Belarusian population which constituted the majority of the population in the district, contributed to the hardships of the first Polish underground movements. It was difficult to organize a clandestine center until the Germans expelled the Soviet forces during Operation Barbarossa, on June 22, 1941.

Formation of the underground took longer than other areas and it was not until July and August 1941 that the Union of Armed Struggle underground center was organized. The first commandant was Captain Rzepniewski "Zabywaty" who served as district commander until 1942. He was followed by Stanisław Popławski "Głuchowski", took over the command and held it until 1943. After his departure, Ludgard Miniakowski, codename "Kmicic", later became a major and chief of staff of the 2nd Home Army Uhlan Regiment, took over the command.

The Bielsk-Białystok railway line ran through the area of the district, on the section from Czeremcha to Strabla, and a branch of the Czeremcha-Hajnówka-Bielsk Podlaski railway line.

The Bielsk Podlaski district was a unique area within the Białystok District of the Home Army due to being forested to the east by the Białowieża Forest, which facilitated all sorts of partisan activity. The district had the largest concentration of Belarusian people, particularly in the eastern part, where Belarusians constituted 72% of the total population. which further contributed to the complexity. Following the Invasion of Poland by Nazi Germany and the installation of the Kreiskommissariat in Bielsk Podlaski and a branch of the Gestapo, the Sicherheitspolizei, the Belarusian Committee and a network of informers and spies recruited from various nationalities, the Germans first applied repressions against the Belarusian population especially in relation to left-wing elements, not sparing Polish nationality either. After the establishment of the collaborative Belarusian committee in Bielsk Podlaski, only nationalist elements among the Belarusian intelligentsia and Orthodox priests were able to join. The vast majority of Belarusian peasants did not support the nationalists and showed hostility towards the occupier. Despite the Nazis' efforts to set Poles against Belarusians, on the contrary, there were frequent cases of Belarusians persecuted by the Nazis coming under the protection of the Home Army units operating in this area.

In November 1942, a Kedyw unit, consisting of 15 Home Army soldiers derailed a train 20 km from Czeremcha by unscrewing the rails, creating a traffic jam involving 10 wagons. The train was carrying equipment, weapons, and ammunition. The disruption lasted 48 hours. In December 1942, a sabotage unit of the district caused the derailment of a train carrying Jews from Vilnius to Treblinka near Nur, in order to enable the Jews to escape. Only a few Jews took advantage of this opportunity. The interruption in traffic lasted about 10 hours. On May 1, 1943, a partisan unit from the village of Falki, Topczewo commune, set out into the field with the task of harassing the Germans with offensive actions, destroying their living forces and means of transport.

=== Operation Tempest ===
At the end of May 1944, the reconstruction of the 2nd Grochow Uhlan Regiment began. The military nomenclature used was the same as that used for infantry regiments: battalions and companies, platoons and squads.

At the end of June and beginning of July 1944, a concentration was carried out based on sabotage units operating in the field since 1942.

The largest group was located near Brańsk, numbering approximately 200 soldiers. The other two groups were concentrated in the Nurzec and Hajnówka areas. Each group had approximately 100 soldiers. If the order was issued and the "W" Hour was announced, these three groups were to serve as the basis for the mobilization and concentration of all soldiers in the Home Army district's field network. Finally, no such order was issued and no general uprising took place in the district. Concentrated units attacked the rearguards of German troops and Russian Liberation Army troops near Jesionówka, Andryjanki, Czarna Cerkiewna and Oleksin.

The tasks for the units of the 2nd Home Army Regiment were as follows:

- Harassing the enemy in guerrilla warfare, destroying enemy live forces and equipment;
- Cutting communication routes, destroying supplies of war materials going to the front;
- Protecting and securing the property and lives of civilians against plunder, robbery and rape by the Vlasovites;
- Cooperation with the attacking units of the Soviet Army and sabotage groups of Soviet partisans.

In the Hajnówka area, a unit of the 4th Battalion of the 2nd Regiment repeatedly disrupted rail communications on the Hajnówka-Czeremcha and Bielsk Podlaski-Czeremcha lines. On the Hajnówka-Kołty road several ambushes were set for German transports, in which several enemy vehicles were destroyed. On the Siemiatycze-Ciechanowiec road, the 3rd Battalion, 2nd Regiment, repeatedly ambushed German supply trains. At the end of July 1944, the Germans organized a raid, which was partially successful. A fight ensued, in which the Germans managed to push back the Polish units. Near the village of Skiwy Duże, a Polish counterattack took place, gaining the upper hand. Several vehicles with equipment and ammunition were destroyed, and several dozen Germans were killed in the fighting. Their own losses were minor, as the cooperation of Soviet partisan units, which attacked the Germans from the flank, surprised the enemy and forced them to retreat.

As equipment and weapons were acquired, the battalions' numbers were increased and by July 1944, the number of armed units totaled 600 men. Following the arrival of the Red Army, on August 4, 1944, a briefing between Soviet commanders and the commanders of the 2nd Home Army Regiment took place in Brańsk. The Soviet command expressed gratitude, stating that the operations of Polish units behind the Wehrmacht had contributed to the faster breaking of German resistance in the Hajnówka-Bug River section. At the same time, they expressed appreciation for the activities of the district command, which protected and rescued Soviet soldiers escaping from German captivity. Within the district, a resting point was established for escaped captives. This point was located in the Tołwin colony, in the Gmina Siemiatycze, on the farm of Maria Tołwińska. After resting, these soldiers were directed to Soviet partisan units via a liaison officer.
