= Koski =

Koski may refer to

Villages in Poland

- Brulino-Koski
- Długołęka-Koski
- Humięcino-Koski
- Koski Duże
- Koski Pierwsze
- Koski-Wypychy

Municipalities in Finland

- Hämeenkoski
- Koski Tl

Other

- Koski (surname)
- Koski Glacier in Antarctica
