= Brzeziny-Janowięta =

Village in Gmina Dziadkowice, Poland

- Village
- Location within Poland
- Coordinates: 52°35′06″N 22°45′04″E
- Country: Poland
- Voivodeship: Podlaskie
- County: Siemiatycze
- Gmina: Dziadkowice
- First mention: 1523
- Population (2021): 70
- Time zone: UTC+1 (Central European Time)
  - Summer (DST): UTC+2 (Central European Summer Time)
- Zip code: 17-306

Brzeziny-Janowięta [bʐɛˈʑinɨ janɔˈvjɛnta] is a village in the administrative district of Gmina Dziadkowice, within Siemiatycze County, Podlaskie Voivodeship, in north-eastern Poland.

== History ==
The name of the town most likely derives from the name Berezynskij, the name of Belarusian knights who occupied the village and had control over it. The first mention of the town came in 1523, where a ducal document stated the landowners of Bielsko Berezyński received a letter for the land left by their uncle Andrzej Berezyński, implying that the Brzeziny-Janowięta was owned by the Berezynskiy family. The second mention of the town comes from a 1528 tax poll of Bielsko, where it is stated that descendants of the knights were living in the town.

The town remained relatively minute until the 18th century, when it was split into 3 different divisions: Janowięta, Niedźwiadki and Wytrykusy.

The population of Brzeziny-Janowięta reached 133 people by 1896, nearly double what it is today.

The 1921 Polish Census listed the combined populations of Janowięta and Niedźwiadki at 168 people; all of them were of Polish Catholic nationality. The villages were eventually merged into Janowięta due to the declining size of Niedźwiadki.

A 1931 ordinance by Minister of the Interior Felicjan Sławoj Składkowski declared that, among other villages, shall be part of the Kąty rural commune rather than the nearby Grodzisk rural commune. The borders were nullified upon the invasion of Nazi Germany and the Soviet Union in 1939.

From 1975 to 1998, the settlement was part of the Białystok Voivodeship, being recategorized under Podlaskie after territorial reform.
