= Nowe Granne =

- Village
- Location within Poland
- Coordinates: 52°33′13″N 22°31′44″E
- Country: Poland
- Voivodeship: Podlaskie
- County: Siemiatycze
- Gmina: Perlejewo

Nowe Granne [ˈnɔvɛ ˈɡrannɛ] is a village in the administrative district of Gmina Perlejewo, within Siemiatycze County, Podlaskie Voivodeship, in north-eastern Poland.
