= Lipiny, Siemiatycze County =

Lipiny
- Village
- Location within Poland
- Coordinates: 52°32′23″N 22°51′26″E
- Country: Poland
- Voivodeship: Podlaskie
- County: Siemiatycze
- Gmina: Dziadkowice

Lipiny [liˈpinɨ] is a village in the administrative district of Gmina Dziadkowice, within Siemiatycze County, Podlaskie Voivodeship, in north-eastern Poland.
