= Stare Krasewicze =

- Village
- Location within Poland
- Coordinates: 52°28′46″N 22°48′54″E
- Country: Poland
- Voivodeship: Podlaskie
- County: Siemiatycze
- Gmina: Siemiatycze
- Population: 60

Stare Krasewicze [ˈstarɛ krasɛˈvit͡ʂɛ] is a village in the administrative district of Gmina Siemiatycze, within Siemiatycze County, Podlaskie Voivodeship, in north-eastern Poland.
