= Twarogi-Wypychy =

- Village
- Location within Poland
- Coordinates: 52°34′12″N 22°38′05″E
- Country: Poland
- Voivodeship: Podlaskie
- County: Siemiatycze
- Gmina: Perlejewo
- Postal code: 17-322
- Vehicle registration: BSI

Twarogi-Wypychy [tfaˈrɔɡi vɨˈpɨxɨ] is a village in the administrative district of Gmina Perlejewo, within Siemiatycze County, Podlaskie Voivodeship, in eastern Poland.

Two Polish citizens were murdered by Nazi Germany in the village during World War II.
