= Malinowo, Siemiatycze County =

Malinowo
- Village
- Location within Poland
- Coordinates: 52°33′N 22°50′E
- Country: Poland
- Voivodeship: Podlaskie
- County: Siemiatycze
- Gmina: Dziadkowice

Malinowo [maliˈnɔvɔ] is a village in the administrative district of Gmina Dziadkowice, within Siemiatycze County, Podlaskie Voivodeship, in north-eastern Poland.
