= Krasewicze-Czerepy =

- Village
- Location within Poland
- Coordinates: 52°29′21″N 22°48′19″E
- Country: Poland
- Voivodeship: Podlaskie
- County: Siemiatycze
- Gmina: Siemiatycze
- Population: 30

Krasewicze-Czerepy [krasɛˈvit͡ʂɛ t͡ʂɛˈrɛpɨ] is a village in the administrative district of Gmina Siemiatycze, within Siemiatycze County, Podlaskie Voivodeship, in north-eastern Poland.
