= Siemiatycze-Stacja =

- Village
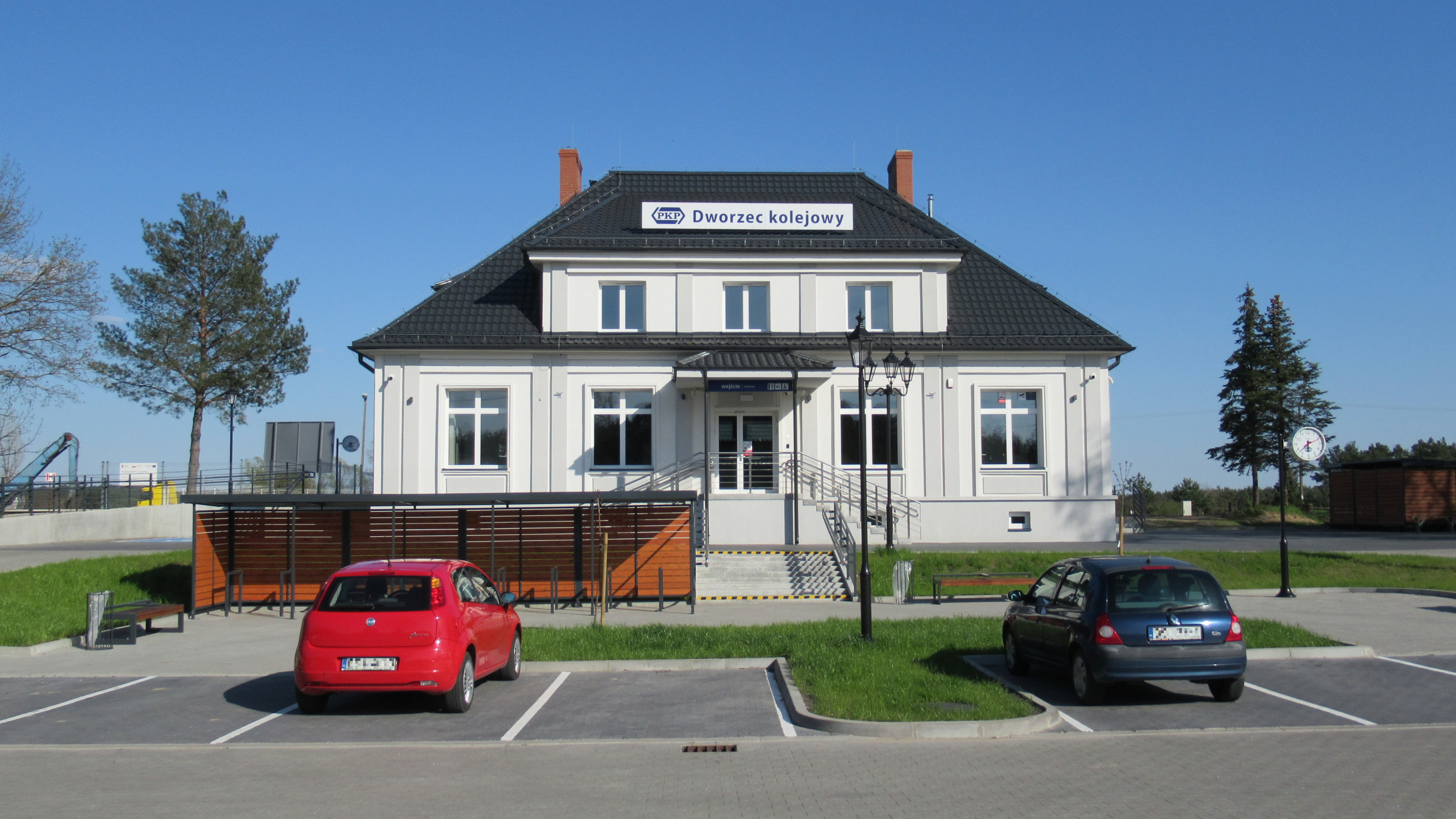
- Train station in Siemiatycze

- Location within Poland
- Coordinates: 52°23′33″N 22°56′42″E
- Country: Poland
- Voivodeship: Podlaskie
- County: Siemiatycze
- Gmina: Siemiatycze

Siemiatycze-Stacja [ɕɛmjaˈtɨt͡ʂɛ ˈstat͡sja] is a village in the administrative district of Gmina Siemiatycze, within Siemiatycze County, Podlaskie Voivodeship, in north-eastern Poland.
