= Wólka Nadbużna, Podlaskie Voivodeship =

Wólka Nadbużna
- Village
- Location within Poland
- Coordinates: 52°22′00″N 22°50′44″E
- Country: Poland
- Voivodeship: Podlaskie
- County: Siemiatycze
- Gmina: Siemiatycze

Wólka Nadbużna [ˈvulka nadˈbuʐna] is a village in the administrative district of Gmina Siemiatycze, within Siemiatycze County, Podlaskie Voivodeship, in north-eastern Poland.
