= Wiercień Duży =

- Village
- Location within Poland
- Coordinates: 52°30′N 22°53′E
- Country: Poland
- Voivodeship: Podlaskie
- County: Siemiatycze
- Gmina: Siemiatycze
- Population: 120

Wiercień Duży [ˈvjɛrt͡ɕɛɲ ˈduʐɨ] is a village in the administrative district of Gmina Siemiatycze, within Siemiatycze County, Podlaskie Voivodeship, in north-eastern Poland.

In 2008 the village had a population of 120.
