= Ignacy Pieńkowski =

Polish painter and pedagogue

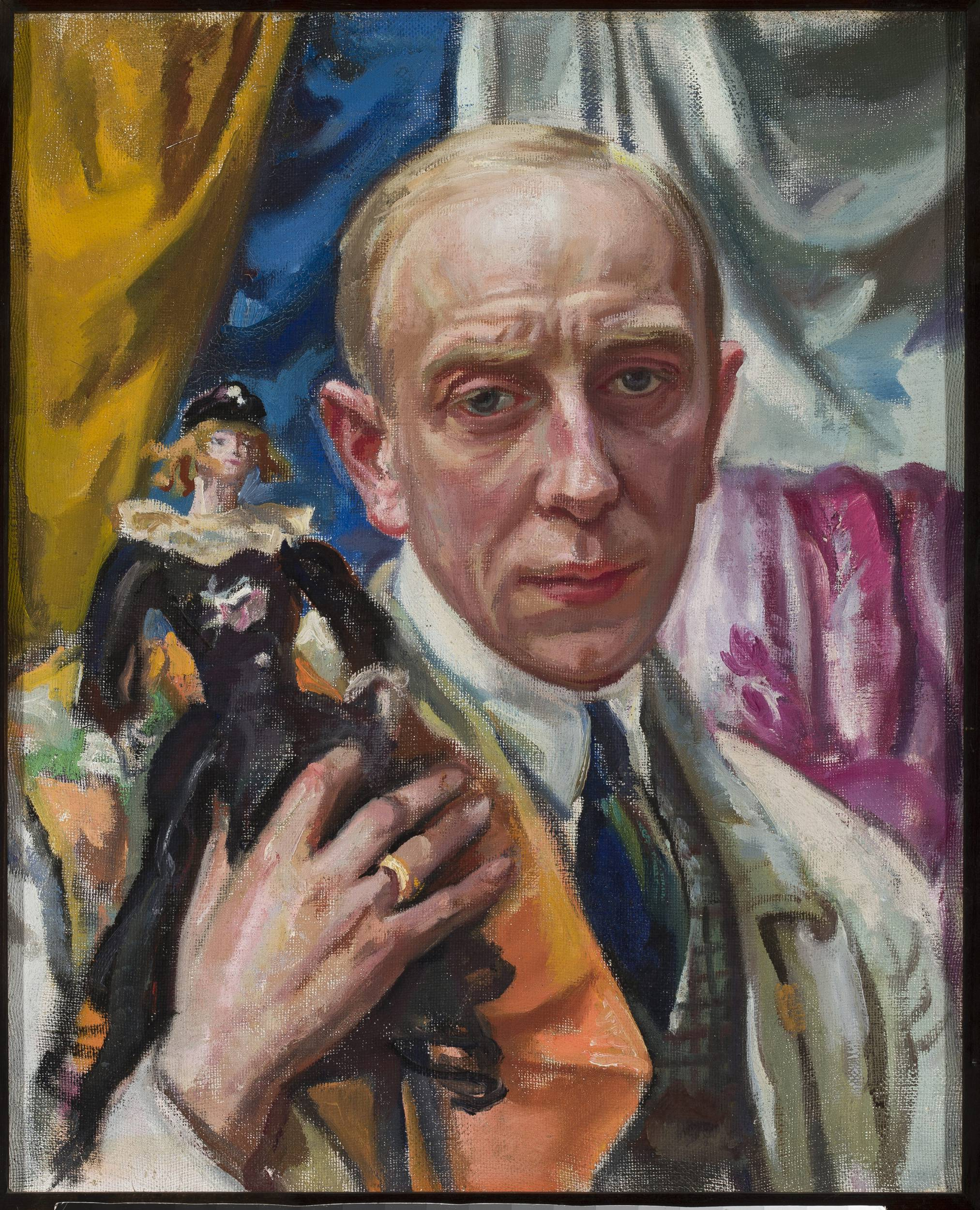
Autoportrait

Ignacy Pieńkowski (19 July 1877, Dołubowo – 6 December 1948, Kraków) was a Polish painter and pedagogue. He was active primarily in Kraków. He was the brother of the prominent physicist Stefan Pieńkowski. In 1892, he was educated at an Art school in Warsaw under Wojciech Gerson. He continued his studies in Kraków under Teodor Axentowicz and Leon Wyczółkowski. He travelled across the world, to Brazil, Russia, Germany, and the United States.
