= Wiercień Mały =

- Village
- Location within Poland
- Coordinates: 52°29′42″N 22°52′3″E
- Country: Poland
- Voivodeship: Podlaskie
- County: Siemiatycze
- Gmina: Siemiatycze
- Population: 60

Wiercień Mały [ˈvjɛrt͡ɕɛɲ ˈmawɨ] is a village in the administrative district of Gmina Siemiatycze, within Siemiatycze County, Podlaskie Voivodeship, in north-eastern Poland.
