= Borzymy, Siemiatycze County =

Borzymy
- Village
- Location within Poland
- Coordinates: 52°32′N 22°38′E
- Country: Poland
- Voivodeship: Podlaskie
- County: Siemiatycze
- Gmina: Perlejewo

Borzymy [bɔˈʐɨmɨ] is a village in the administrative district of Gmina Perlejewo, within Siemiatycze County, Podlaskie Voivodeship, in north-eastern Poland.
