= Wyromiejki =

- Village
- Location within Poland
- Coordinates: 52°29′N 22°51′E
- Country: Poland
- Voivodeship: Podlaskie
- County: Siemiatycze
- Gmina: Siemiatycze

Wyromiejki [vɨrɔˈmjɛi̯ki] is a village in the administrative district of Gmina Siemiatycze, within Siemiatycze County, Podlaskie Voivodeship, in north-eastern Poland.
