= Wólka Biszewska =

- Village
- Location within Poland
- Coordinates: 52°31′22″N 22°52′08″E
- Country: Poland
- Voivodeship: Podlaskie
- County: Siemiatycze
- Gmina: Siemiatycze

Wólka Biszewska [ˈvulka biˈʂɛfska] is a village in the administrative district of Gmina Siemiatycze, within Siemiatycze County, Podlaskie Voivodeship, in north-eastern Poland.
