= Osmola =

- Village
- Location within Poland
- Coordinates: 52°34′N 22°58′E
- Country: Poland
- Voivodeship: Podlaskie
- County: Siemiatycze
- Gmina: Dziadkowice
- Population: 240

Osmola [ɔsˈmɔla] is a village in the administrative district of Gmina Dziadkowice, within Siemiatycze County, Podlaskie Voivodeship, in north-eastern Poland.

According to the 1921 census, the village was inhabited by 418 people, among whom 401 were Roman Catholic, 7 Orthodox, 1 Greek Catholic, 1 Evangelical and 8 Mosaic. At the same time, 410 inhabitants declared Polish nationality, 8 Jewish. There were 81 residential buildings in the village.
