= Twarogi-Trąbnica =

- Village
- Location within Poland
- Coordinates: 52°32′40″N 22°36′56″E
- Country: Poland
- Voivodeship: Podlaskie
- County: Siemiatycze
- Gmina: Perlejewo

Population
  - Total: 60
- Postal code: 17-322
- Vehicle registration: BSI

Twarogi-Trąbnica [tfaˈrɔɡi trɔmbˈnit͡sa] is a village in the administrative district of Gmina Perlejewo, within Siemiatycze County, Podlaskie Voivodeship, in eastern Poland.
