= Anusin, Gmina Siemiatycze =

Anusin
- Village
- Location within Poland
- Coordinates: 52°23′19″N 22°54′42″E
- Country: Poland
- Voivodeship: Podlaskie
- County: Siemiatycze
- Gmina: Siemiatycze

Anusin [aˈnuɕin] (Belarusian: Анусін, Podlachian: Anúsin) is a village in the administrative district of Gmina Siemiatycze, within Siemiatycze County, Podlaskie Voivodeship, in north-eastern Poland.
