= Jezdimir Lović =

Jezdimir Lović (Serbian: Јездимир Ловић; Gornje Lopiže, near Sjenica, March 18, 1919 — Krupice, near Pljevlja, mid-August 1943) was a participant in the National Liberation War and a People's Hero of Yugoslavia.

== Biography ==
He was born on March 18, 1919, in the village of Gornje Lopiže, near Sjenica. He came from a poor peasant family. He completed elementary school in his home village in 1931 and graduated from civic school in Sjenica in 1935. Afterward, in search of employment, he went to Belgrade. After a long search, he was admitted to the boarding school of the Serb Business Association "Privrednik", where he worked as an apprentice in a bookstore during the day and attended apprentice school at night.

While still an apprentice, he participated in the actions of the revolutionary commercial youth. In 1937, he became a member of the Workers' Sports Society "Polet". He quickly distinguished himself in the actions of the Privrednik youth and the work of "Polet," leading to his admission into the League of Communist Youth of Yugoslavia (SKOJ) in 1938. He was a participant and organizer of many labor organizations and strikes, including the demonstrations of December 14, 1939. He was one of the organizers of the strike by the revolutionary part of the Privrednik youth, for which he was expelled from the dormitory. He stood out in the youth demonstrations on September 8, 1940, in Košutnjak, after which he was arrested and held in police custody until the military coup of March 27, 1941. He was admitted to the membership of the Communist Party of Yugoslavia (CPY) during 1940.

After the occupation of Yugoslavia in 1941, he left Belgrade and returned to his home region, where he immediately joined the preparations for organizing an uprising. In the autumn of 1941, when the Sjenica Partisan Company was formed, he became the deputy political commissar. From the first battles, he distinguished himself with bravery, especially during the attack on Sjenica on December 22, 1941. When the First Zlatar Battalion was formed in February 1942, he was appointed deputy political commissar of the battalion.

When the 3rd Proletarian Sandžak Strike Brigade was formed from the Sandžak battalions on June 5, 1942, near Foča, he was appointed deputy political commissar of its First Battalion. After the death of Rifat Burdžović in October 1942, he was appointed deputy political commissar of the brigade. From June 1942 to April 1943, he followed the war path of the Third Sandžak Brigade and participated in many battles, during which he stood out as a brave fighter and a capable military and political leader.

At the end of May 1943, by decision of the Central Committee of the CPY, he left the brigade and took over the function of secretary of the Regional Committee of the CPY for Sandžak. After a few days, with about thirty fighters, he set off from the area of Nedajno, near Plužine, toward Sandžak. Immediately upon taking office as secretary of the Regional Committee, he developed intense party activity—restoring District Committees and forming new party organizations. These party activists carried out armed actions against the occupiers and quislings. The Regional Committee, under his leadership, organized the acceptance and gathering of the Third Sandžak Brigade, which returned to Sandžak after the Battle of Sutjeska.

In mid-August 1943, near the village of Krupice, near Pljevlja, he fell into a Chetnik ambush and was killed.

By decree of the Presidium of the National Assembly of the FPR Yugoslavia on December 14, 1949, he was proclaimed a People's Hero.
