= Wojeniec =

- Village
- Location within Poland
- Coordinates: 52°35′N 22°56′E
- Country: Poland
- Voivodeship: Podlaskie
- County: Siemiatycze
- Gmina: Dziadkowice

Wojeniec [vɔˈjɛɲɛt͡s] is a village in the administrative district of Gmina Dziadkowice, within Siemiatycze County, Podlaskie Voivodeship, in north-eastern Poland.
