= Patry =

Patry is a French surname derived from Irish given name Patrick (with regular fall of final -ck [k] in French) and equivalent to Patrice. It may refer to:

== People ==
- André Patry (1902–1960), French astronomer
- Bernard Patry (born 1943), Canadian politician
- Claude Patry (born 1953), Canadian politician
- Denis Patry (born 1953), Canadian ice hockey player
- Gilles G. Patry – Canadian engineer and academic administrator (born 1950)
- Guillaume Patry (born 1982), Canadian video-game player
- Jean Patry – French volleyball player (born 1996)
- Michel Patry – Swiss high jumper
- Pierre Patry (1933–2014), Canadian film director and screenwriter
- Rudy Patry (born 1961), Belgian racing cyclist
- Stéphane Patry – Swiss ice hockey player
- Steve Patry – Canadian documentary filmmaker
- Walter Patry (1917–1945), German air force World War II pilot
- William F. Patry (born 1950), American copyright lawyer
- Yvan Patry (1948–1999), Canadian documentary filmmaker

== Places ==
- Bernières-le-Patry, commune in Normandy, France
- Culey-le-Patry, commune in Normandy, France
- Kłopoty-Patry, village in Podlaskie province, Poland
- La Lande-Patry, commune in Normandy, France
- Le Mesnil-Patry, commune in Normandy, France

== Others ==
- 1601 Patry, minor planet named after André Patry
- Patry (Black Clover) – Fictional character in the Black Clover Manga series
