= Zaporośl =

- Village
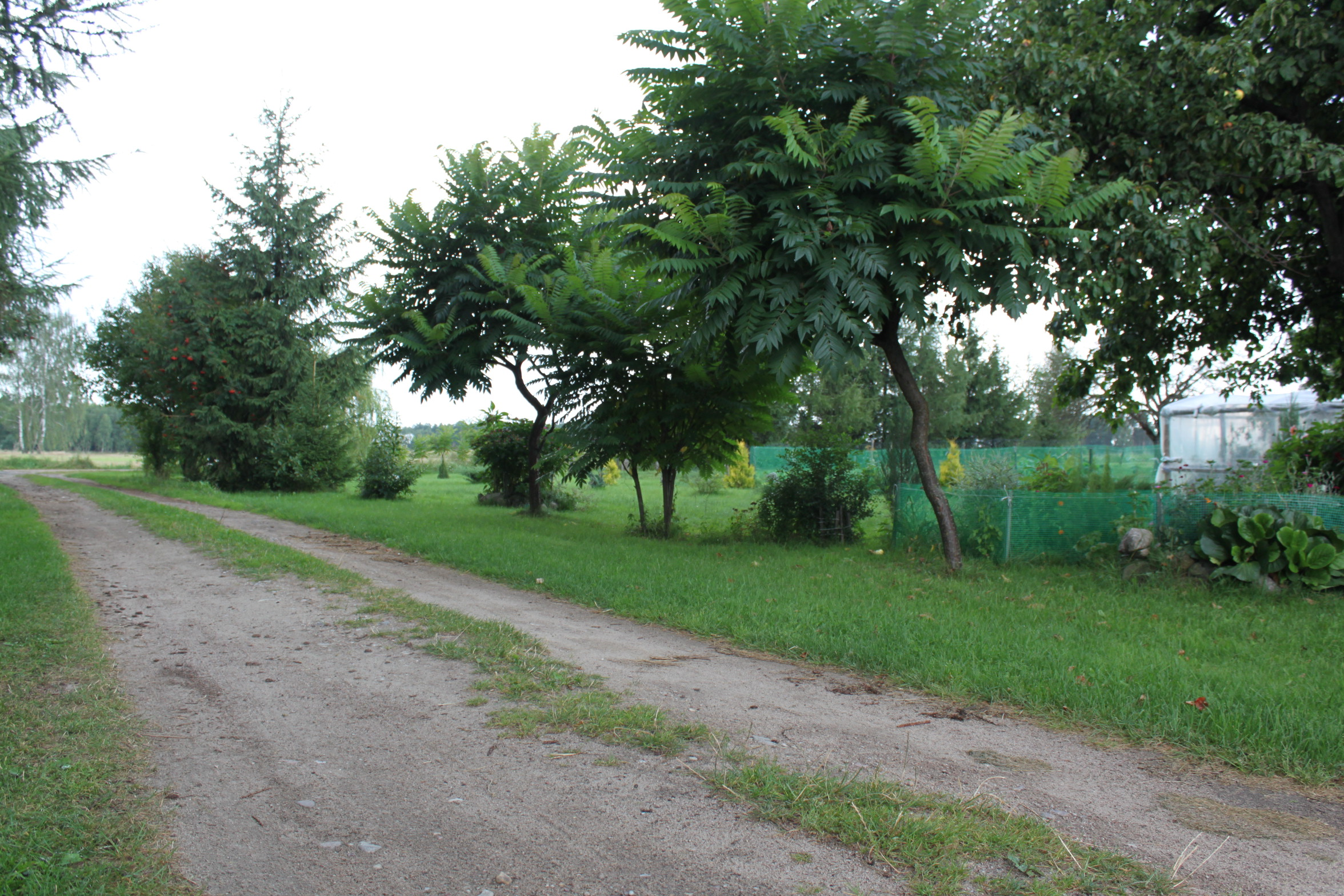
- Trees in Zaporośle

- Location within Poland
- Coordinates: 52°33′21″N 23°00′32″E
- Country: Poland
- Voivodeship: Podlaskie
- County: Siemiatycze
- Gmina: Dziadkowice

Zaporośl [zaˈpɔrɔɕl] is a village in the administrative district of Gmina Dziadkowice, within Siemiatycze County, Podlaskie Voivodeship, in north-eastern Poland.
