= Poniaty =

- Village
- Location within Poland
- Coordinates: 52°37′N 22°33′E
- Country: Poland
- Voivodeship: Podlaskie
- County: Siemiatycze
- Gmina: Perlejewo
- Number Zone: (+48) 86
- Vehicle registration: BSI

Poniaty [pɔˈɲatɨ] is a village in the administrative district of Gmina Perlejewo, within Siemiatycze County, Podlaskie Voivodeship, in north-eastern Poland.
