= Ogrodniki, Siemiatycze County =

Ogrodniki
- Village
- Location within Poland
- Coordinates: 52°23′N 22°48′E
- Country: Poland
- Voivodeship: Podlaskie
- County: Siemiatycze
- Gmina: Siemiatycze
- Time zone: UTC+1 (CET)
  - Summer (DST): UTC+2 (CEST)
- Postal code: 17-300
- Vehicle registration: BSI

Ogrodniki [ɔɡrɔdˈɲikʲi] is a village in the administrative district of Gmina Siemiatycze, within Siemiatycze County, Podlaskie Voivodeship, in eastern Poland, situated near the border with Belarus.

Eight Polish citizens were murdered by Nazi Germany in the village during World War II.
