= Słochy Annopolskie =

- Village
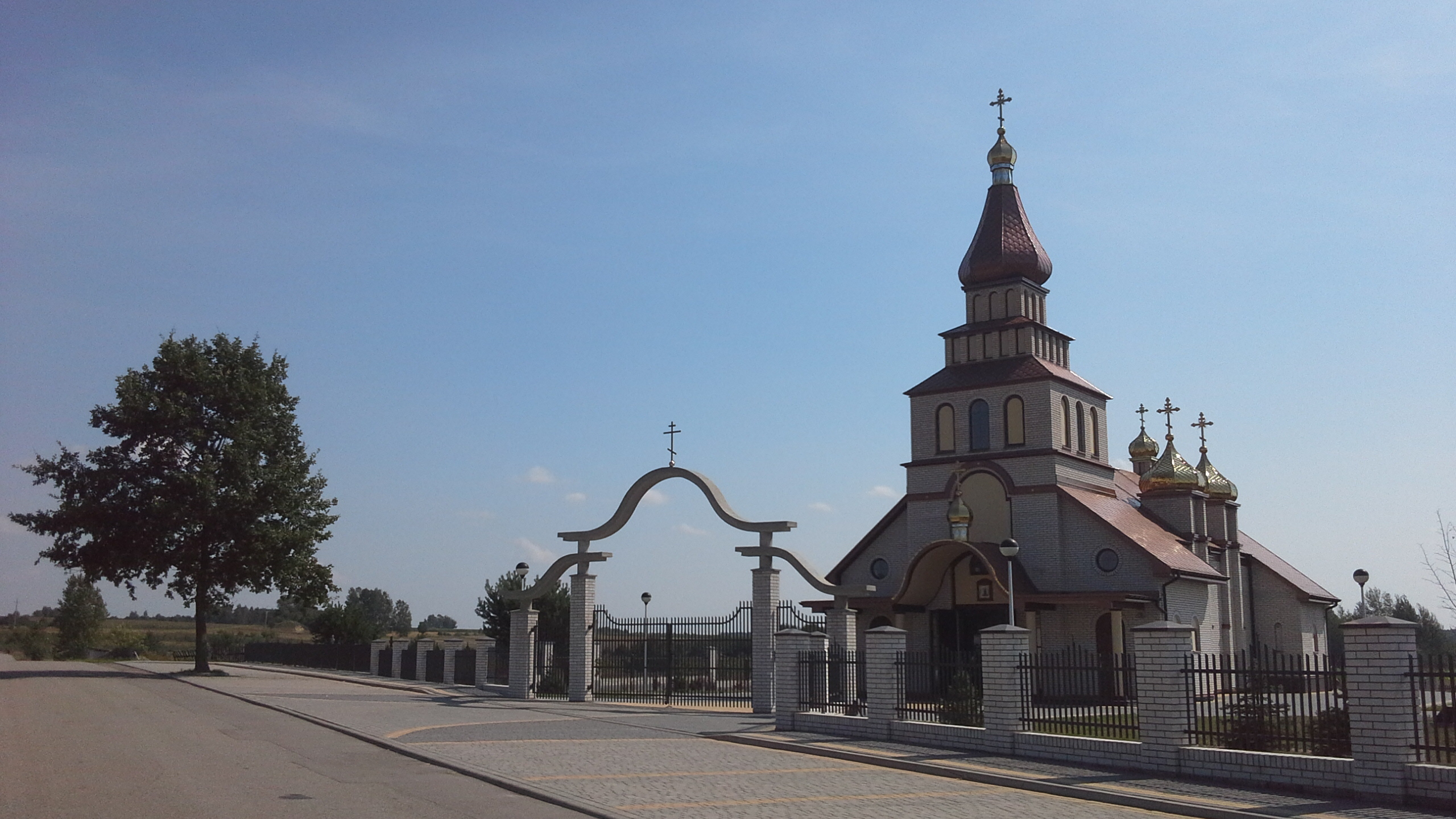
- Orthodox church of Saint Mary Magdalene

- Location within Poland
- Coordinates: 52°23′34″N 22°49′52″E
- Country: Poland
- Voivodeship: Podlaskie
- County: Siemiatycze
- Gmina: Siemiatycze

Słochy Annopolskie [ˈswɔxɨ annɔˈpɔlskʲɛ] is a village in the administrative district of Gmina Siemiatycze, within Siemiatycze County, Podlaskie Voivodeship, in north-eastern Poland.

According to the 1921 census, the village was inhabited by 212 people, among whom 24 were Roman Catholic, 136 Orthodox, 2 Evangelical and 50 Mosaic. At the same time, 23 inhabitants declared Polish nationality, 138 Belarusian, 1 German and 50 Jewish. There were 37 residential buildings in the village.
