= Klekotowo =

- Village
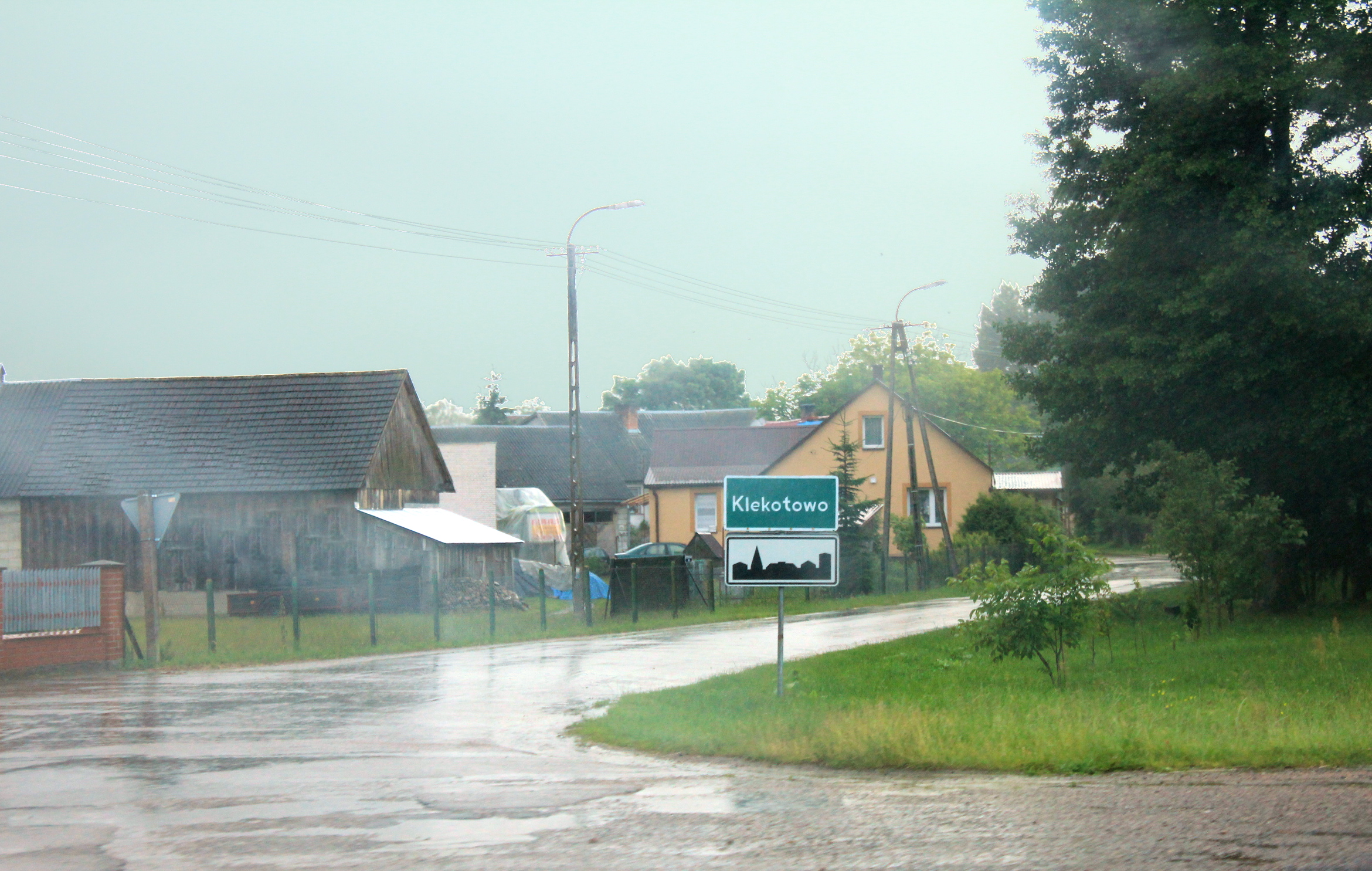

- Location within Poland
- Coordinates: 52°23′47″N 22°46′04″E
- Country: Poland
- Voivodeship: Podlaskie
- County: Siemiatycze
- Gmina: Siemiatycze

Klekotowo [klɛkɔˈtɔvɔ] is a village in the administrative district of Gmina Siemiatycze, within Siemiatycze County, Podlaskie Voivodeship, in north-eastern Poland.
