= Żuniewo =

- Village
- Location within Poland
- Coordinates: 52°31′45″N 23°00′42″E
- Country: Poland
- Voivodeship: Podlaskie
- County: Siemiatycze
- Gmina: Dziadkowice

Żuniewo [ʐuˈɲɛvɔ] is a village in the administrative district of Gmina Dziadkowice, within Siemiatycze County, Podlaskie Voivodeship, in north-eastern Poland.
