= Skiwy Małe =

- Village
- Location within Poland
- Coordinates: 52°28′52″N 22°45′12″E
- Country: Poland
- Voivodeship: Podlaskie
- County: Siemiatycze
- Gmina: Siemiatycze
- Population: 140

Skiwy Małe [ˈskivɨ ˈmawɛ] is a village in the administrative district of Gmina Siemiatycze, within Siemiatycze County, Podlaskie Voivodeship, in north-eastern Poland.
