= Granne =

- Village
- Location within Poland
- Coordinates: 52°32′N 22°30′E
- Country: Poland
- Voivodeship: Podlaskie
- County: Siemiatycze
- Gmina: Perlejewo
- Population: 320

Granne [ˈɡrannɛ] is a village in the administrative district of Gmina Perlejewo, within Siemiatycze County, Podlaskie Voivodeship, in north-eastern Poland.

According to the 1921 census, the village was inhabited by 354 people, among whom 340 were Roman Catholic and 14 Mosaic. At the same time, all inhabitants declared Polish nationality. There were 52 residential buildings in the village.
