= Kłopoty-Stanisławy =

- Village
- Location within Poland
- Coordinates: 52°30′52″N 22°47′55″E
- Country: Poland
- Voivodeship: Podlaskie
- County: Siemiatycze
- Gmina: Siemiatycze

Kłopoty-Stanisławy [kwɔˈpɔtɨ staniˈswavɨ] (Polish: Troubles-Stanislavs) is a village in north-eastern Poland, located in the administrative district of Gmina Siemiatycze, within Siemiatycze County, Podlaskie Voivodeship.
