= Moczydły-Pszczółki =

Village in Gmina Perlejewo, Poland

- Village
- Location within Poland
- Coordinates: 52°35′52″N 22°37′13″E
- Country: Poland
- Voivodeship: Podlaskie
- County: Siemiatycze
- Gmina: Perlejewo

Moczydły-Pszczółki [mɔˈt͡ʂɨdwɨ ˈpʂt͡ʂuu̯ki] is a village in the administrative district of Gmina Perlejewo, within Siemiatycze County, Podlaskie Voivodeship, in north-eastern Poland.
