= Wiktorowo, Podlaskie Voivodeship =

Wiktorowo
- Village
- Location within Poland
- Coordinates: 52°34′29″N 22°30′54″E
- Country: Poland
- Voivodeship: Podlaskie
- County: Siemiatycze
- Gmina: Perlejewo

Wiktorowo [viktɔˈrɔvɔ] is a village in the administrative district of Gmina Perlejewo, within Siemiatycze County, Podlaskie Voivodeship, in north-eastern Poland.
