= Krasewicze-Jagiełki =

- Village
- Location within Poland
- Coordinates: 52°29′3″N 22°48′45″E
- Country: Poland
- Voivodeship: Podlaskie
- County: Siemiatycze
- Gmina: Siemiatycze
- Population: 40

Krasewicze-Jagiełki (Polish pronunciation: [krasɛˈvit͡ʂɛ jaˈɡʲɛwkʲi]) is a village in the administrative district of Gmina Siemiatycze, within Siemiatycze County, Podlaskie Voivodeship, in north-eastern Poland.
