= Moczydły-Kukiełki =

Village in Gmina Perlejewo, Poland

- Village
- Location within Poland
- Coordinates: 52°35′45″N 22°37′51″E
- Country: Poland
- Voivodeship: Podlaskie
- County: Siemiatycze
- Gmina: Perlejewo

Moczydły-Kukiełki [mɔˈt͡ʂɨdwɨ kuˈkʲɛu̯ki] is a village in the administrative district of Gmina Perlejewo, within Siemiatycze County, Podlaskie Voivodeship, in north-eastern Poland.
