= Zalesie, Gmina Siemiatycze =

Zalesie
- Village
- Location within Poland
- Coordinates: 52°30′12″N 22°46′16″E
- Country: Poland
- Voivodeship: Podlaskie
- County: Siemiatycze
- Gmina: Siemiatycze
- Postal code: 17-300

Zalesie [zaˈlɛɕɛ] is a village in the administrative district of Gmina Siemiatycze, within Siemiatycze County, Podlaskie Voivodeship, in eastern Poland.
