= Kadłub, Podlaskie Voivodeship =

Kadłub
- Village
- Location within Poland
- Coordinates: 52°30′10″N 22°57′51″E
- Country: Poland
- Voivodeship: Podlaskie
- County: Siemiatycze
- Gmina: Siemiatycze

Kadłub [ˈkadwup] is a village in the administrative district of Gmina Siemiatycze, within Siemiatycze County, Podlaskie Voivodeship, in north-eastern Poland.
