= Głęboczek, Podlaskie Voivodeship =

Głęboczek
- Village
- Location within Poland
- Coordinates: 52°33′N 22°29′E
- Country: Poland
- Voivodeship: Podlaskie
- County: Siemiatycze
- Gmina: Perlejewo
- Population: 90

Głęboczek [ɡwɛmˈbɔt͡ʂɛk] is a village in the administrative district of Gmina Perlejewo, within Siemiatycze County, Podlaskie Voivodeship, in north-eastern Poland.
