= Korzeniówka Duża =

- Village
- Location within Poland
- Coordinates: 52°27′42″N 22°44′35″E
- Country: Poland
- Voivodeship: Podlaskie
- County: Siemiatycze
- Gmina: Siemiatycze
- Population: 120

Korzeniówka Duża [kɔʐɛˈɲufka ˈduʐa] is a village in the administrative district of Gmina Siemiatycze, within Siemiatycze County, Podlaskie Voivodeship, in north-eastern Poland.
