= Lović =

Lović is a Serbian (Ловић) and Croatian surname. Its Americanized form is Lovich. Hungarianized form: Lovics. Notable people with the surname include:

- Jezdimir Lović (1919–1943) Yugoslav WWII partisan, National Hero of Yugoslavia
- Toni Lović (born 1967), Croatian guitarist and record producer
