= Leśniki, Siemiatycze County =

Leśniki
- Village
- Location within Poland
- Coordinates: 52°35′N 22°28′E
- Country: Poland
- Voivodeship: Podlaskie
- County: Siemiatycze
- Gmina: Perlejewo
- Postal code: 17-312
- Vehicle registration: BSI

Leśniki [lɛɕˈniki] is a village in the administrative district of Gmina Perlejewo, within Siemiatycze County, Podlaskie Voivodeship, in eastern Poland.

Four Polish citizens were murdered by Nazi Germany in the village during World War II.
