= Korzeniówka Mała =

- Village
- Location within Poland
- Coordinates: 52°27′21″N 22°44′42″E
- Country: Poland
- Voivodeship: Podlaskie
- County: Siemiatycze
- Gmina: Siemiatycze
- Population: 40

Korzeniówka Mała [kɔʐɛˈɲufka ˈmawa] is a village in the administrative district of Gmina Siemiatycze, within Siemiatycze County, Podlaskie Voivodeship, in north-eastern Poland.
