= Stare Moczydły, Gmina Perlejewo =

Stare Moczydły
- Village
- Location within Poland
- Coordinates: 52°35′20″N 22°37′21″E
- Country: Poland
- Voivodeship: Podlaskie
- County: Siemiatycze
- Gmina: Perlejewo

Stare Moczydły [ˈstarɛ mɔˈt͡ʂɨdwɨ] is a village in the administrative district of Gmina Perlejewo, within Siemiatycze County, Podlaskie Voivodeship, in north-eastern Poland.
