= Zaręby, Podlaskie Voivodeship =

Zaręby
- Village
- Location within Poland
- Coordinates: 52°34′N 22°53′E
- Country: Poland
- Voivodeship: Podlaskie
- County: Siemiatycze
- Gmina: Dziadkowice

Zaręby [zaˈrɛmbɨ] is a village in the administrative district of Gmina Dziadkowice, within Siemiatycze County, Podlaskie Voivodeship, in north-eastern Poland.

According to the 1921 census, the village was inhabited by 176 people, among whom 172 were Roman Catholic, 1 Orthodox and 3 Mosaic. At the same time, 175 inhabitants declared Polish nationality and 1 Belarusian. There were 34 residential buildings in the village.
