= Żurobice =

- Village
- Location within Poland
- Coordinates: 52°32′N 22°56′E
- Country: Poland
- Voivodeship: Podlaskie
- County: Siemiatycze
- Gmina: Dziadkowice

Żurobice [ʐurɔˈbʲit͡sɛ] is a village in the administrative district of Gmina Dziadkowice, within Siemiatycze County, Podlaskie Voivodeship, in north-eastern Poland.

According to the 1921 census, the village was inhabited by 438 people, among whom 148 were Roman Catholic, 236 Orthodox, and 27 Mosaic. At the same time, 161 inhabitants declared Polish nationality, 250 Belarusian et 27 la nationalité juive. There were 88 residential buildings in the village.
