= Cecele =

- Village
- Location within Poland
- Coordinates: 52°28′N 22°46′E
- Country: Poland
- Voivodeship: Podlaskie
- County: Siemiatycze
- Gmina: Siemiatycze

Cecele [t͡sɛˈt͡sɛlɛ] is a village in the administrative district of Gmina Siemiatycze, within Siemiatycze County, Podlaskie Voivodeship, in north-eastern Poland.
