= Klukowo, Siemiatycze County =

Klukowo
- Village
- Location within Poland
- Coordinates: 52°27′N 22°47′E
- Country: Poland
- Voivodeship: Podlaskie
- County: Siemiatycze
- Gmina: Siemiatycze
- Population (2015): 25

Klukowo [kluˈkɔvɔ] is a village in the administrative district of Gmina Siemiatycze, within Siemiatycze County, Podlaskie Voivodeship, in north-eastern Poland.
