= Boratyniec Ruski =

- Village
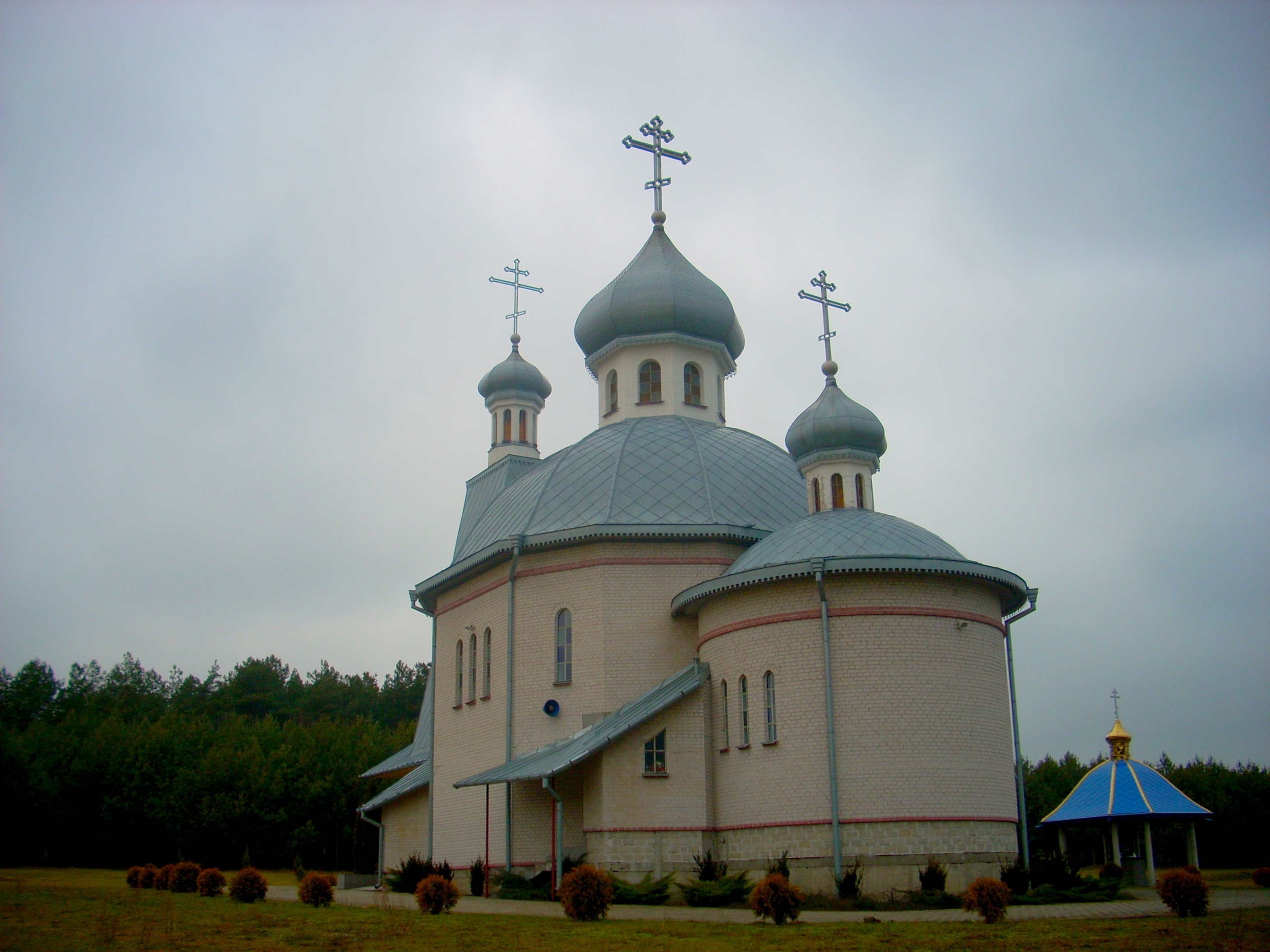
- Orthodox church of Saint Anne

- Location within Poland
- Coordinates: 52°24′N 22°56′E
- Country: Poland
- Voivodeship: Podlaskie
- County: Siemiatycze
- Gmina: Siemiatycze

Boratyniec Ruski [bɔraˈtɨɲɛt͡s ˈruskʲi] is a village in the administrative district of Gmina Siemiatycze, within Siemiatycze County, Podlaskie Voivodeship, in north-eastern Poland.
