= Kłopoty-Bujny =

- Village
- Location within Poland
- Coordinates: 52°30′26″N 22°48′12″E
- Country: Poland
- Voivodeship: Podlaskie
- County: Siemiatycze
- Gmina: Siemiatycze

Kłopoty-Bujny (Polish pronunciation: [kwɔˈpɔtɨ ˈbujnɨ]) is a village in the administrative district of Gmina Siemiatycze, within Siemiatycze County, Podlaskie Voivodeship, in north-eastern Poland.
