= Czarkówka Mała =

- Village
- Location within Poland
- Coordinates: 52°36′N 22°35′E
- Country: Poland
- Voivodeship: Podlaskie
- County: Siemiatycze
- Gmina: Perlejewo

Czarkówka Mała [t͡ʂarˈkufka ˈmawa] is a village in the administrative district of Gmina Perlejewo, within Siemiatycze County, Podlaskie Voivodeship, in north-eastern Poland.
