= Kłopoty-Bańki =

- Village
- Location within Poland
- Coordinates: 52°31′22″N 22°47′19″E
- Country: Poland
- Voivodeship: Podlaskie
- County: Siemiatycze
- Gmina: Siemiatycze

Kłopoty-Bańki [kwɔˈpɔtɨ ˈbaɲki] (translation: Troubles-Bubbles) is a village in the administrative district of Gmina Siemiatycze, within Siemiatycze County, Podlaskie Voivodeship, in north-eastern Poland.
