= Baciki Dalsze =

- Village
- Location within Poland
- Coordinates: 52°28′N 22°55′E
- Country: Poland
- Voivodeship: Podlaskie
- County: Siemiatycze
- Gmina: Siemiatycze
- Time zone: UTC+1 (CET)
  - Summer (DST): UTC+2 (CEST)

Baciki Dalsze [baˈt͡ɕikʲi ˈdalʂɛ] is a village in the administrative district of Gmina Siemiatycze, within Siemiatycze County, Podlaskie Voivodeship, in eastern Poland.

== History ==
Four Polish citizens were murdered by Nazi Germany in the village during World War II.
