= Kruzy =

Kruzy may refer to the following places in Poland:

- Kruzy, Podlaskie Voivodeship
- Kruzy, Warmian-Masurian Voivodeship
