= Grzyby-Orzepy =

- Village
- Location within Poland
- Coordinates: 52°28′03″N 22°48′46″E
- Country: Poland
- Voivodeship: Podlaskie
- County: Siemiatycze
- Gmina: Siemiatycze

Grzyby-Orzepy [ˈɡʐɨbɨ ɔˈʐɛpɨ] is a village in the administrative district of Gmina Siemiatycze, within Siemiatycze County, Podlaskie Voivodeship, in north-eastern Poland.
