= Stare Moczydły, Gmina Siemiatycze =

Stare Moczydły
- Village
- Location within Poland
- Coordinates: 52°30′51″N 22°45′41″E
- Country: Poland
- Voivodeship: Podlaskie
- County: Siemiatycze
- Gmina: Siemiatycze

Stare Moczydły [ˈstarɛ mɔˈt͡ʂɨdwɨ] is a village in the administrative district of Gmina Siemiatycze, within Siemiatycze County, Podlaskie Voivodeship, in north-eastern Poland.
