= Twarogi Lackie =

- Village
- Location within Poland
- Coordinates: 52°34′N 22°36′E
- Country: Poland
- Voivodeship: Podlaskie
- County: Siemiatycze
- Gmina: Perlejewo
- Postal code: 17-322
- Vehicle registration: BSI

Twarogi Lackie [tfaˈrɔɡi ˈlat͡skʲɛ] is a village in the administrative district of Gmina Perlejewo, within Siemiatycze County, Podlaskie Voivodeship, in eastern Poland.

Five Polish citizens were murdered by Nazi Germany in the village during World War II.
