= Kosky =

Kosky is a surname. Notable people with the surname include:

- Barrie Kosky (1967–), Australian theatre and opera director
- Lynne Kosky (1958–2014), Australian politician
- Paul Kosky, Australian music producer (see Killing Heidi)

== See also ==
- Koski (surname)
- Corey Koskie (born 1973), Canadian baseball player
- Murray James Koskie (1929–2004), Canadian educator, lawyer, politician
- Scott Koskie (born 1971), Canadian volleyball player

== Places ==
- Koski Duże, a village in Poland
- Kosky Peak, a mountain in the Welch Mountains, Palmer Land, Antarctica
- Koski Tl, a municipality in Finland
