= Polish Radio London =

British Polish-language radio station

Polish Radio London Polskie Radio Londyn
- London; England
- Broadcast area: Greater London
- Branding: PRL 24

Programming
- Language: Polish

Links
- Website: prl24.co.uk

Polish Radio London (Polish: Polskie Radio Londyn; also known as PRL 24) is a radio channel designed for Polish audience in the United Kingdom and Ireland, launched on 13 December 2006. It is available on DAB in the London area only and over the internet. The transmission on digital satellite has now ceased.

The acronym PRL alludes to the Polish People's Republic, which had the same acronym in Polish.

The radio is partnered with a Polish free weekly print magazine, Cooltura.

The station plays a mixture of Polish and English-language contemporary pop and club music.
