= Głody =

- Village
- Location within Poland
- Coordinates: 52°34′48″N 22°27′52″E
- Country: Poland
- Voivodeship: Podlaskie
- County: Siemiatycze
- Gmina: Perlejewo
- Elevation: 109 m (358 ft)
- Population (approx.): 25

Głody [ˈɡwɔdɨ] is a village in the administrative district of Gmina Perlejewo, within Siemiatycze County, Podlaskie Voivodeship, in north-eastern Poland. It runs along the Bug River and is located near the small village of Kobyla.
