= Moczydły-Dubiny =

- Village
- Location within Poland
- Coordinates: 52°36′10″N 22°37′32″E
- Country: Poland
- Voivodeship: Podlaskie
- County: Siemiatycze
- Gmina: Perlejewo

Moczydły-Dubiny [mɔˈt͡ʂɨdwɨ duˈbinɨ] is a village in the administrative district of Gmina Perlejewo, within Siemiatycze County, Podlaskie Voivodeship, in north-eastern Poland.
