= Twarogi Ruskie =

- Village
- Location within Poland
- Coordinates: 52°34′N 22°37′E
- Country: Poland
- Voivodeship: Podlaskie
- County: Siemiatycze
- Gmina: Perlejewo
- Postal code: 17-322
- Vehicle registration: BSI

Twarogi Ruskie [tfaˈrɔɡi ˈruskʲɛ] is a village in the administrative district of Gmina Perlejewo, within Siemiatycze County, Podlaskie Voivodeship, in eastern Poland.
