= Pełch =

- Village
- Location within Poland
- Coordinates: 52°36′N 22°30′E
- Country: Poland
- Voivodeship: Podlaskie
- County: Siemiatycze
- Gmina: Perlejewo

Pełch [pɛu̯x] is a village in the administrative district of Gmina Perlejewo, within Siemiatycze County, Podlaskie Voivodeship, in north-eastern Poland.

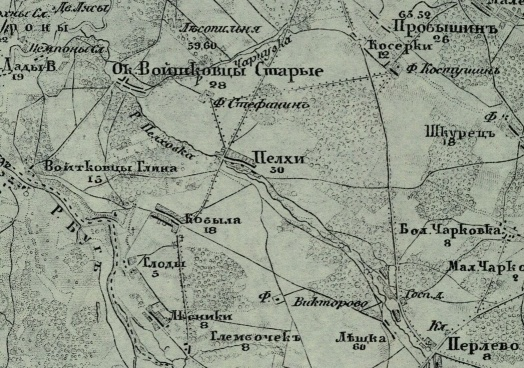
Pełch (Пелхи) village on Shubert map (1866)
