= Hryćki =

- Village
- Location within Poland
- Coordinates: 52°24′09″N 22°57′03″E
- Country: Poland
- Voivodeship: Podlaskie
- County: Siemiatycze
- Gmina: Siemiatycze

Hryćki [ˈxrɨt͡ɕki] is a village in the administrative district of Gmina Siemiatycze, within Siemiatycze County, Podlaskie Voivodeship, in northeastern Poland.
