= Miodusy-Pokrzywne =

- Village
- Location within Poland
- Coordinates: 52°32′52″N 22°35′30″E
- Country: Poland
- Voivodeship: Podlaskie
- County: Siemiatycze
- Gmina: Perlejewo

Miodusy-Pokrzywne [mjɔˈdusɨ pɔˈkʂɨvnɛ] is a village in the administrative district of Gmina Perlejewo, within Siemiatycze County, Podlaskie Voivodeship, in north-eastern Poland.
