= Hornowo =

- Village
- Location within Poland
- Coordinates: 52°33′N 22°59′E
- Country: Poland
- Voivodeship: Podlaskie
- County: Siemiatycze
- Gmina: Dziadkowice

Hornowo [xɔrˈnɔvɔ] is a village in the administrative district of Gmina Dziadkowice, within Siemiatycze County, Podlaskie Voivodeship, in north-eastern Poland.

According to the 1921 census, the village was inhabited by 489 people, among whom 408 were Roman Catholic, 64 Orthodox, and 17 Mosaic. At the same time, all inhabitants declared Polish nationalityn. There were 81 residential buildings in the village.
