= Boratyniec Lacki =

- Village
- Location within Poland
- Coordinates: 52°25′N 22°57′E
- Country: Poland
- Voivodeship: Podlaskie
- County: Siemiatycze
- Gmina: Siemiatycze

Boratyniec Lacki [bɔraˈtɨɲɛt͡s ˈlat͡ski] is a village in the administrative district of Gmina Siemiatycze, within Siemiatycze County, Podlaskie Voivodeship, in north-eastern Poland.

According to the 1921 census, the village was inhabited by 135 people, among whom 112 were Roman Catholic, 9 Orthodox, and 14 Mosaic. At the same time, 114 inhabitants declared Polish nationality, 7 Belarusian, and 14 Jewish. There were 24 residential buildings in the village.
