= Skiwy Duże =

Village in Gmina Siemiatycze, Poland

- Village
- Location within Poland
- Coordinates: 52°28′55″N 22°45′55″E
- Country: Poland
- Voivodeship: Podlaskie
- County: Siemiatycze
- Gmina: Siemiatycze

Skiwy Duże [ˈskivɨ ˈduʐɛ] is a village in the administrative district of Gmina Siemiatycze, within Siemiatycze County, Podlaskie Voivodeship, in north-eastern Poland.
