= Szerszenie =

- Village
- Location within Poland
- Coordinates: 52°24′N 22°57′E
- Country: Poland
- Voivodeship: Podlaskie
- County: Siemiatycze
- Gmina: Siemiatycze

Szerszenie [ʂɛrˈʂɛɲɛ] is a village in the administrative district of Gmina Siemiatycze, within Siemiatycze County, Podlaskie Voivodeship, in north-eastern Poland.

According to the 1921 census, the village was inhabited by 123 people, among whom 12 were Roman Catholic, 106 Orthodox, 1 Greek Catholic and 4 Mosaic. At the same time, all inhabitants declared Polish nationality. There were 23 residential buildings in the village.
