= Perlejewo =

- Village
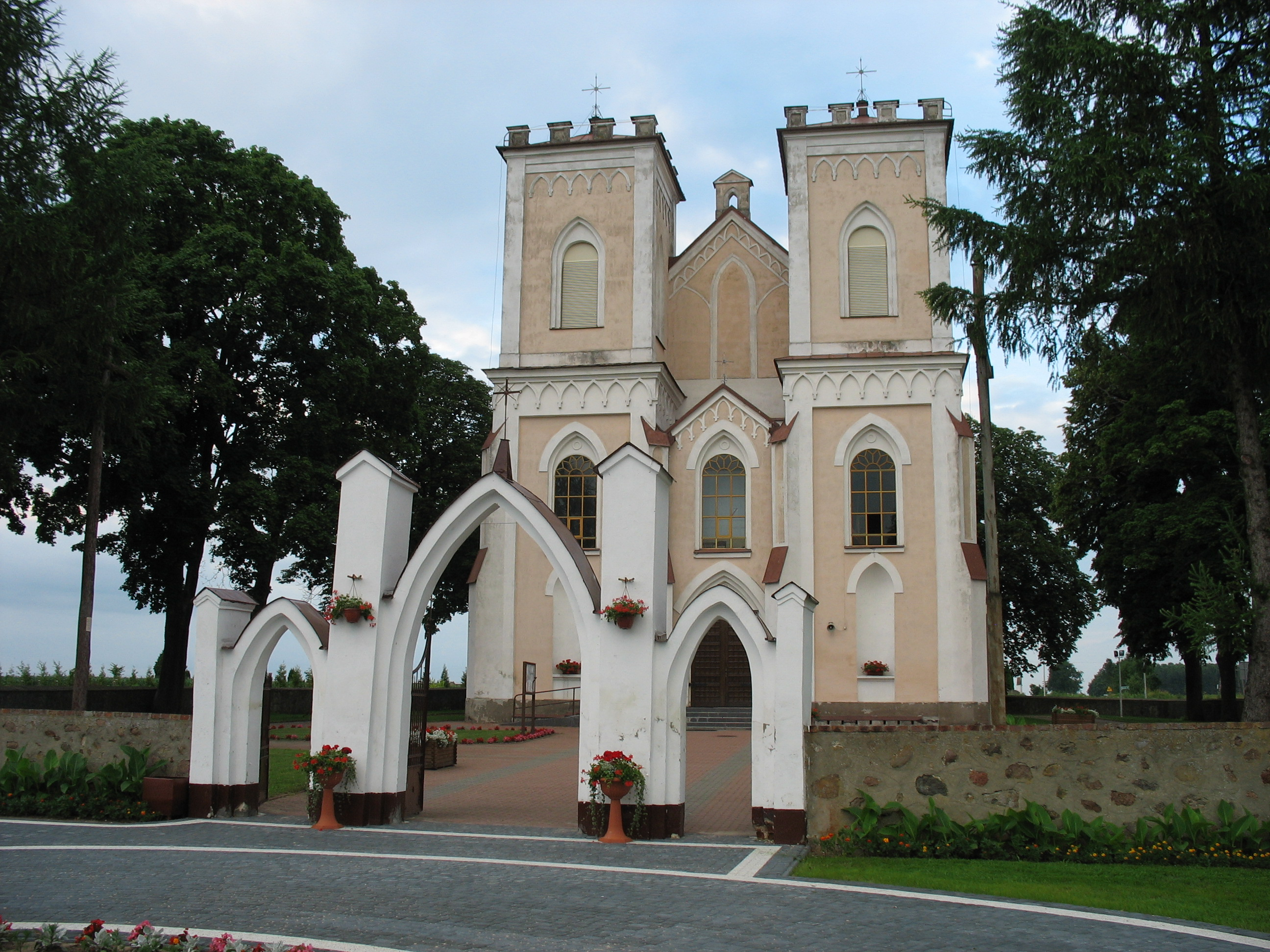

- Location within Poland
- Coordinates: 52°34′N 22°34′E
- Country: Poland
- Voivodeship: Podlaskie
- County: Siemiatycze
- Gmina: Perlejewo
- Time zone: UTC+1 (CET)
  - Summer (DST): UTC+2 (CEST)
- Postal Codes: 17-322
- Number Zone: (+48) 85
- Vehicle registration: BSI

Perlejewo [pɛrlɛˈjɛvɔ] is a village in Siemiatycze County, Podlaskie Voivodeship, in north-eastern Poland. It is the seat of the gmina (administrative district) called Gmina Perlejewo.

== History ==
Three Polish citizens were murdered by Nazi Germany in the village during World War II.
