= Tołwin =

- Village
- Location within Poland
- Coordinates: 52°30′N 22°57′E
- Country: Poland
- Voivodeship: Podlaskie
- County: Siemiatycze
- Gmina: Siemiatycze
- Postal code: 17-300
- Vehicle registration: BSI

Tołwin [ˈtɔu̯vin] is a village in the administrative district of Gmina Siemiatycze, within Siemiatycze County, Podlaskie Voivodeship, in eastern Poland.

== History ==
Local legend has it that the name of the village comes from an old inn that was located on the Eastern part, at the main crossroad of the village. The story goes that this inn was fully functional up until World War II, and that travelers going on the main route from Białystok to Siemiatycze, would stop at this inn to rest. However, the innkeeper, wanting to keep his clients longer than the usual—and wanting to make a few more pretty pennies—would keep them inebriated with cheap wine. The idea was that the drunken guests would buy more food. The innkeeper always kept large quantities of wine on the main table or "stół wina"—translated to a table full of wine. When these drunken guests would finally get on their way South or North, heavily inebriated, they were often asked by other passersby why they were so drunk. To which the answer was "stół wina" which sounds also like "z Tołwina" or "we are coming from Tołwin". As with all local legends, this story is passed down from generation to generation and has several variations. To which all variations have in common the "table full of wine" at the old inn. Since World War II, the inn has burnt down due to being abandoned. In its place now stands a small wooden cottage built after 1950.

According to the 1921 census, the village was inhabited by 360 people, among whom 330 were Roman Catholic, 22 Jewish, and 8 Orthodox. At the same time, 331 inhabitants declared Polish nationality, 22 Jewish and 7 Belarusian. There were 55 residential buildings in the village.

Five Polish citizens were murdered by Nazi Germany in the village during World War II.
