= Dziadkowice, Podlaskie Voivodeship =

Dziadkowice
- Village
- Location within Poland
- Coordinates: 52°33′N 22°54′E
- Country: Poland
- Voivodeship: Podlaskie
- County: Siemiatycze
- Gmina: Dziadkowice

Dziadkowice [d͡ʑatkɔˈvʲit͡sɛ] is a village in Siemiatycze County, Podlaskie Voivodeship, in north-eastern Poland. It is the seat of the gmina (administrative district) called Gmina Dziadkowice.

According to the 1921 census, the village was inhabited by 107 people, among whom 67 were Roman Catholic, 36 Orthodox, and 4 Mosaic. At the same time, 75 inhabitants declared Polish nationality, 32 Belarusian. There were 22 residential buildings in the village.
