= Kąty, Siemiatycze County =

Kąty
- Village
- Location within Poland
- Coordinates: 52°33′N 22°56′E
- Country: Poland
- Voivodeship: Podlaskie
- County: Siemiatycze
- Gmina: Dziadkowice
- Time zone: UTC+1 (CET)
  - Summer (DST): UTC+2 (CEST)

Kąty [ˈkɔntɨ] is a village in the administrative district of Gmina Dziadkowice, within Siemiatycze County, Podlaskie Voivodeship, in eastern Poland.
