= Dołubowo =

- Village
- Location within Poland
- Coordinates: 52°37′N 22°53′E
- Country: Poland
- Voivodeship: Podlaskie
- County: Siemiatycze
- Gmina: Dziadkowice
- Population: 393

Dołubowo [dɔwuˈbɔvɔ] is a village in the administrative district of Gmina Dziadkowice, within Siemiatycze County, Podlaskie Voivodeship, in north-eastern Poland.
