= Cooltura =

Polish-language magazine in the United Kingdom

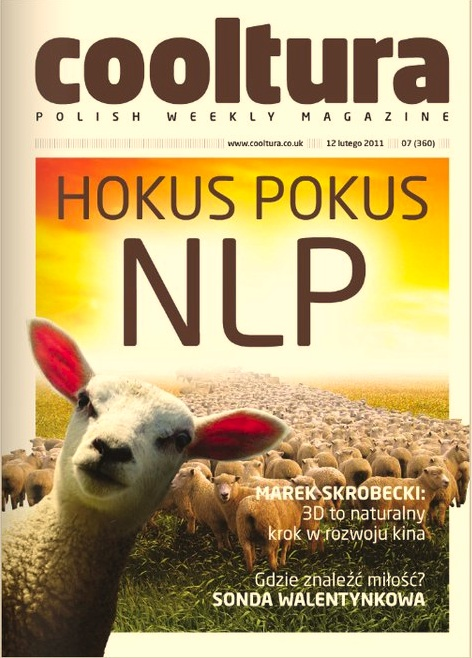
- The 12 February 2011 front page of Cooltura
- Type: Weekly magazine
- Format: Compact
- Owner: Polish Media London
- Editor: Marcin Urban
- Founded: 1 May 2004
- Political alignment: none
- Headquarters: Isleworth, London, UK
- Circulation: 40,000
- Price: Free
- ISSN: 1743-8489
- Website: www.cooltura24.co.uk

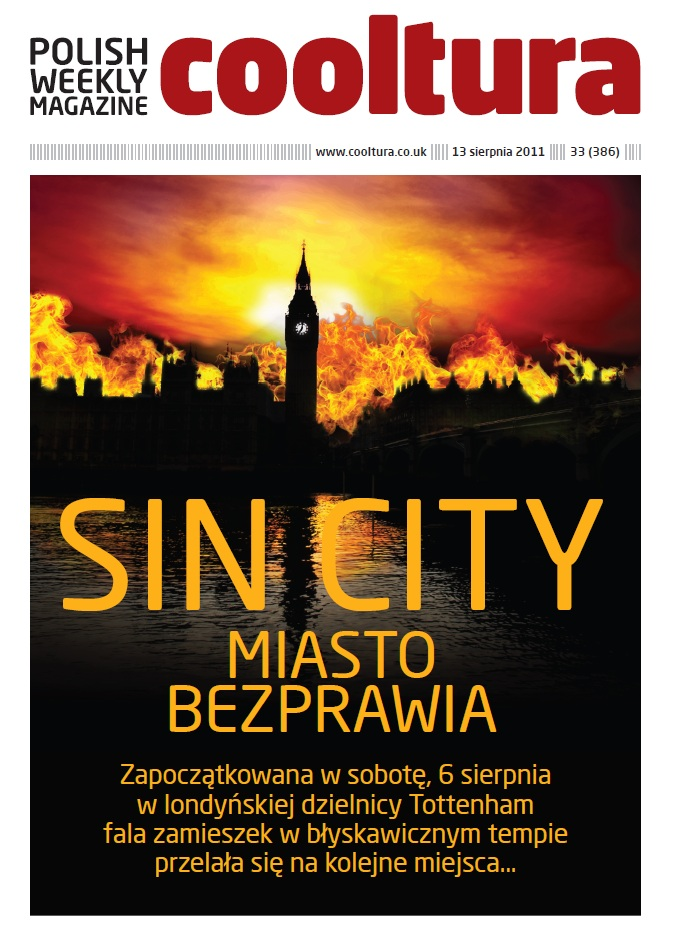
Another Front Page

Cooltura is a Polish-language magazine, published weekly in the United Kingdom with a print run of 55,000 copies.

== History ==
Cooltura was founded by Włodzimierz Wojciech Witkowski, the chairman of Sara-Int LTD and Polish Media Group. The first issue of the magazine has been distributed in 10.000 copies and had 40 pages. It was launched 7 weeks prior to Poland joining the European Union. The third issue of Cooltura increased its page number to 48. The 7th issue, published in May 2004, had 64 pages.

Due to Poland's integration with the EU and the massive influx of Poles into the UK, the magazine has been rapidly developing. In 2007 the content of Cooltura expanded to 132 pages. Between 2007 and 2011 the circulation of Cooltura reached 45.000 copies and has been distributed to 500 outlets in London and the nearby areas.

In March 2009 Cooltura changed its layout and headpiece. The content of the weekly magazine was divided into four main sections: News (based mainly on the information from Polish Press Association (PAP), Features, Entertainment (culture, events listings, crosswords and horoscope) and Classifieds.

February 2010 saw the launch of "Cooltura UK" – the regional edition of the magazine, distributed biweekly to various cities in England and Wales. The circulation of "Cooltura UK" reached 10.000 copies. It was suspended in 2022.

== Initiatives ==
Cooltura has been involved in many events related to the life of Poles in London. The magazine regularly organizes music festivals as well as charity events.

== Concerts and Festivals ==
- Maanam, 21 March 2004 r., O2 Shepherd's Bush Empire
- Bajm, 3 October 2004 r., O2 Shepherd's Bush Empire
- Perfect, 16 March 2007 r., Hammersmith Palais
- Grzegorz Turnau, 12 November 2007 r., Embassy of the Republic of Poland
- Maryla Rodowicz, 30 March 2008 r., Koko
- Budka Suflera, 4 May 2008 r., Koko
- Golec uOrkiestra, 30 November 2008, Koko
- Feel, 7 November 2009, O2 Shepherd's Bush Empire
- Myslovitz, 23 October 2010, O2 Shepherd's Bush Empire
- Cooltura Festival 2009 – Kasia Kowalska, Kasia Cerekwicka, Natalia Lesz, 8 March 2009, O2 Shepherd's Bush Empire
- Cooltura Festival 2010 – Lady Pank and Coma, 24 May 2010, O2 Shepherd's Bush Empire
- Cooltura Festival 2011 – Perfect, 16 May 2011, O2 Shepherd's Bush Empire
- Cooltura Festival 2012 - Tatiana Okupnik and Kora, 24 March 2012, O2 Shepherd's Bush Empire
- Cooltura Festival 2013 - Pectus, Enej and Kombii, 9 March 2013, O2 Shepherd's Bush Empire

== Charity events ==
Polish Children's Donations, London, November 2005 r. – The Charity event where £7, 280, 84 has been raised to buy 30.000 meals for primary school children from some of the poorest boroughs in Poland (Nurc Stacja, Tyrów, Czarna Wieś Kościelna, Szerszenie, Goniądz).

== Partner of the events ==
- Polish Festival, Slough 2005
- Polish Festival, London, Hanger Lane 2006

== Contributors ==
Agnieszka Bielamowicz, Joanna Biszewska, Tomasz Borejza, Michalina Buenk, Filip Cuprych, Małgorzata Demetriou, Sergiusz Hieronimczak, Stanisław Koczot, Jarosław Malesa, Łukasz Marczewski, Martyna Porzezińska, Andrzej Świdlicki, Marianna Wielgosz, Andrzej Wróbel, Radosław Zapałowski, Dariusz A. Zeller, Marcin Urban, Radosław Zapałowski, Piotr Gulbicki, Joanna Karwecka,
