= Koskela (disambiguation) =

== Places ==
- Koskela is a district in Helsinki, Finland.
- Koskela is a district in Oulu, Finland.

== Other uses ==
- Koskela (surname)
- Koskela Light, a sector light tower in Oulu, Finland
