= Koski (surname) =

- Language: Finnish

Origin
- Meaning: "rapids", derived from koski ("rapids, whitewater")
- Region of origin: Finland

Koski is a surname of Laine type originating in Finland (in Finnish, it means "rapids"). Notable people with the surname include:

- Brian Koski (born 20th century), U.S. commentator on football (soccer) talk shows
- Darius Koski (born 1971), American guitarist and songwriter
- Eetu Koski (born 1992), Finnish ice hockey player
- Heikki Koski (1940–2024), Finnish civil servant and politician
- Ilkka Koski (1928–1993), Finnish boxer, Olympic bronze medal
- Jarmo Koski (born 1951), Finnish actor, voice actor
- J. J. Koski (born 1996), American football player
- Markku Koski (born 1981), Finnish snowboarder

== See also ==
- Kosky
- Koskinen
- Koskela
