= Gmina Dziadkowice =

Gmina Dziadkowice Dziadkowice Commune
- Gmina
- Coat of arms
- Interactive map of Gmina Dziadkowice
- Coordinates (Dziadkowice): 52°33′N 22°54′E
- Country: Poland
- Voivodeship: Podlaskie
- County: Siemiatycze
- Seat: Dziadkowice

Area
  - Total: 115.71 km^{2} (44.68 sq mi)

Population (2006)
  - Total: 3,058
  - Density: 26.43/km^{2} (68.45/sq mi)

Gmina Dziadkowice is a rural gmina (administrative district) in Siemiatycze County, Podlaskie Voivodeship, in north-eastern Poland. Its seat is the village of Dziadkowice, which lies approximately 14 kilometres (9 mi) north of Siemiatycze and 66 km (41 mi) south of the regional capital Białystok.

The gmina covers an area of 115.71 square kilometres (44.7 sq mi), and as of 2006 its total population is 3,058.

== Villages ==
Gmina Dziadkowice contains the villages and settlements of Brzeziny-Janowięta, Dołubowo, Dziadkowice, Hornowo, Hornowszczyzna, Jasienówka, Kąty, Korzeniówka, Lipiny, Malewice, Malinowo, Osmola, Smolugi, Smolugi-Kolonia, Wojeniec, Zaminowo, Zaporośl, Zaręby, Żuniewo and Żurobice.

== Neighbouring gminas ==
Gmina Dziadkowice is bordered by the gminas of Boćki, Brańsk, Grodzisk, Milejczyce and Siemiatycze.
