= Kruzy, Podlaskie Voivodeship =

Kruzy
- Village
- Location within Poland
- Coordinates: 52°33′N 22°29′E
- Country: Poland
- Voivodeship: Podlaskie
- County: Siemiatycze
- Gmina: Perlejewo
- Elevation: 120 m (390 ft)
- Population: 60

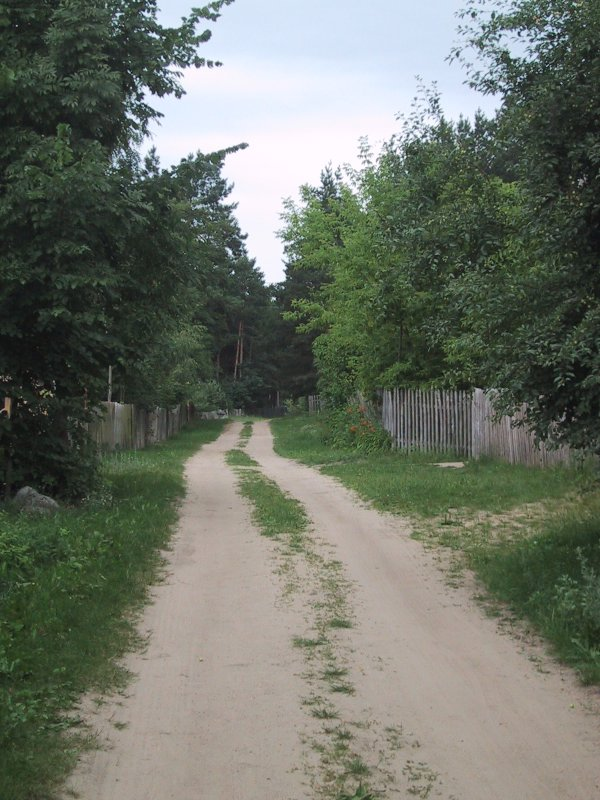
Road in Kruzy

Kruzy [ˈkruzɨ] is a village in the administrative district of Gmina Perlejewo, within Siemiatycze County, Podlaskie Voivodeship, in north-eastern Poland.
