= Gmina Perlejewo =

Gmina Perlejewo Perlejewo Commune
- Gmina
- Interactive map of Gmina Perlejewo
- Coordinates (Perlejewo): 52°34′N 22°34′E
- Country: Poland
- Voivodeship: Podlaskie
- County: Siemiatycze
- Seat: Perlejewo

Area
  - Total: 106.32 km^{2} (41.05 sq mi)

Population (2006)
  - Total: 3,149
  - Density: 29.62/km^{2} (76.71/sq mi)
- Website: http://pietko.fm.interia.pl/

Gmina Perlejewo is a rural gmina (administrative district) in Siemiatycze County, Podlaskie Voivodeship, in north-eastern Poland. Its seat is the village of Perlejewo, which lies approximately 26 kilometres (16 mi) north-west of Siemiatycze and 74 km (46 mi) south-west of the regional capital Białystok.

The gmina covers an area of 106.32 square kilometres (41.1 sq mi), and as of 2006 its total population is 3,149.

== Villages ==
Gmina Perlejewo contains the villages and settlements of Borzymy, Czarkówka Duża, Czarkówka Mała, Głęboczek, Głody, Granne, Kobyla, Koski Duże, Koski-Wypychy, Kruzy, Leśniki, Leszczka Duża, Leszczka Mała, Miodusy-Dworaki, Miodusy-Inochy, Miodusy-Pokrzywne, Moczydły-Dubiny, Moczydły-Kukiełki, Moczydły-Pszczółki, Nowe Granne, Olszewo, Osnówka, Osnówka-Wyręby, Pełch, Perlejewo, Pieczyski, Poniaty, Stare Moczydły, Twarogi Lackie, Twarogi Ruskie, Twarogi-Mazury, Twarogi-Trąbnica, Twarogi-Wypychy and Wiktorowo.

== Neighbouring gminas ==
Gmina Perlejewo is bordered by the gminas of Ciechanowiec, Drohiczyn, Grodzisk and Jabłonna Lacka.
