= Topczewo =

- Village
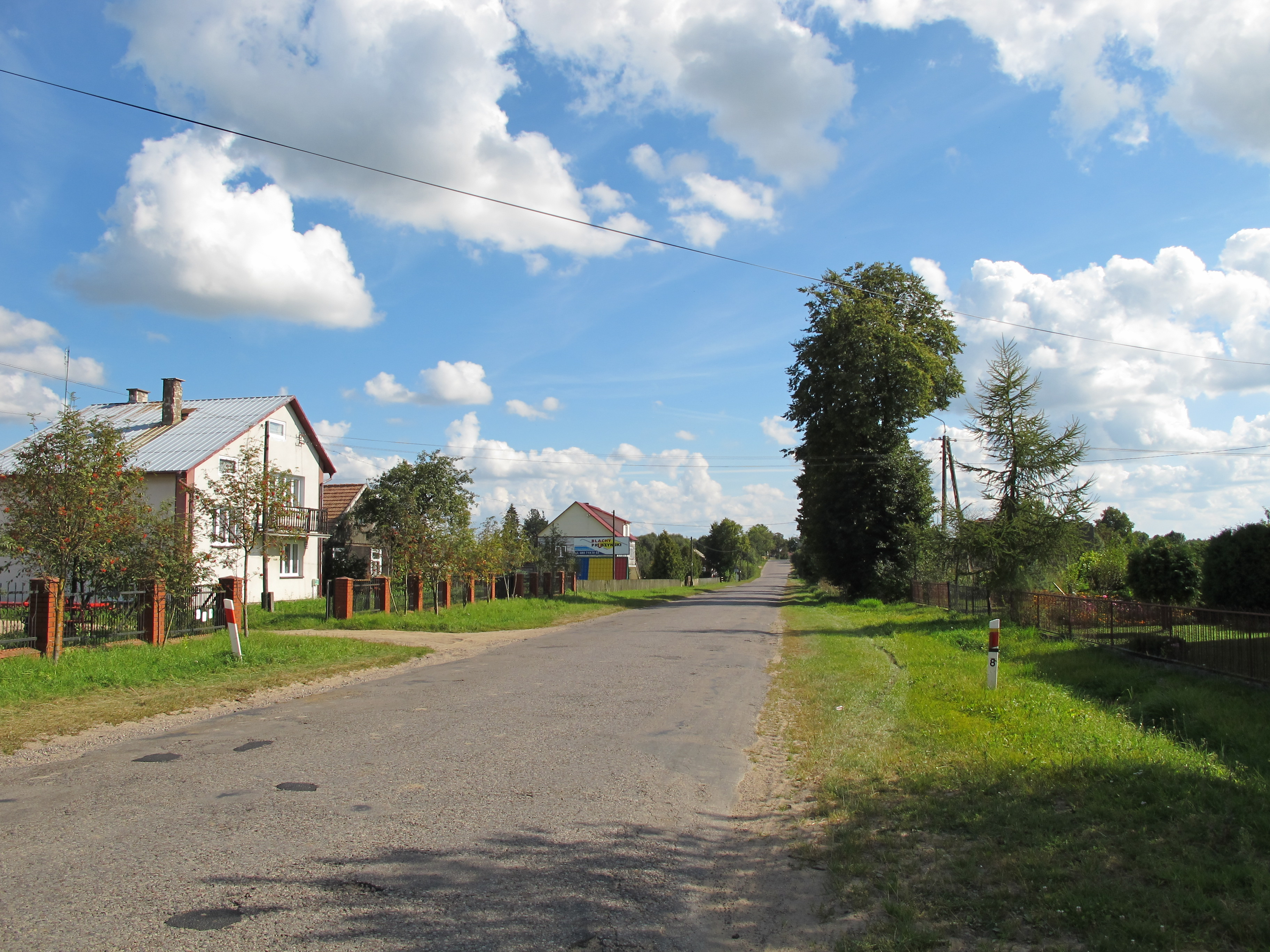

- Location within Poland
- Coordinates: 52°51′N 22°54′E
- Country: Poland
- Voivodeship: Podlaskie
- County: Bielsk
- Gmina: Wyszki
- Time zone: UTC+1 (CET)
  - Summer (DST): UTC+2 (CEST)
- Vehicle registration: BBI

Topczewo [tɔpˈt͡ʂɛvɔ] is a village in the administrative district of Gmina Wyszki, within Bielsk County, Podlaskie Voivodeship, in north-eastern Poland.

== History ==
Following the German-Soviet invasion of Poland, which started World War II in September 1939, the village was occupied by the Soviet Union until 1941 and then by Germany until 1944. Polish partisans of the Home Army launched an attack on a German gendarmerie post in Topczewo on 6 June 1943.
