= Gmina Siemiatycze =

Gmina Siemiatycze Siemiatycze Commune
- Gmina
- Interactive map of Gmina Siemiatycze
- Coordinates (Siemiatycze): 52°25′38″N 22°51′45″E
- Country: Poland
- Voivodeship: Podlaskie
- County: Siemiatycze
- Seat: Siemiatycze

Area
  - Total: 227.14 km^{2} (87.70 sq mi)

Population (2006)
  - Total: 6,451
  - Density: 28.40/km^{2} (73.56/sq mi)

Gmina Siemiatycze is a rural gmina (administrative district) in Siemiatycze County, Podlaskie Voivodeship, in north-eastern Poland. Its seat is the town of Siemiatycze, although the town is not part of the territory of the gmina.

The gmina covers an area of 227.14 square kilometres (87.7 sq mi), and as of 2006 its total population is 6,451.

== Villages ==
Gmina Siemiatycze contains the villages and settlements of Anusin, Baciki Bliższe, Baciki Dalsze, Baciki Średnie, Boratyniec Lacki, Boratyniec Ruski, Cecele, Czartajew, Grzyby-Orzepy, Hałasówka, Hryćki, Kadłub, Kajanka, Klekotowo, Kłopoty-Bańki, Kłopoty-Bujny, Kłopoty-Patry, Kłopoty-Stanisławy, Klukowo, Korzeniówka Duża, Korzeniówka Mała, Krasewicze-Czerepy, Krasewicze-Jagiełki, Krupice, Kułygi, Lachówka, Laskowszczyzna, Leszczka, Ogrodniki, Olendry, Ossolin, Rogawka, Romanówka, Siemiatycze-Stacja, Skiwy Duże, Skiwy Małe, Słochy Annopolskie, Stare Krasewicze, Stare Moczydły, Szerszenie, Tołwin, Turna Duża, Turna Mała, Wiercień Duży, Wiercień Mały, Wólka Biszewska, Wólka Nadbużna, Wyromiejki and Zalesie.

== Neighbouring gminas ==
Gmina Siemiatycze is bordered by the town of Siemiatycze and by the gminas of Drohiczyn, Dziadkowice, Grodzisk, Mielnik, Nurzec-Stacja, Platerów and Sarnaki.
