= Timo Koskinen =

Finnish musician

Timo Koskinen (born 1965) is a Finnish classical pianist.

Koskinen studied the piano at the Helsinki Conservatory of Music, the Sibelius Academy, and the Fryderyk Chopin Music Academy. Prize winner in national piano competitions in Finland, Koskinen has given numerous concerts in Finland and abroad, in addition to playing as an accompanist in national and international music competitions. Since 1993, Koskinen has been working as a chamber pianist lecturer at the Sibelius Academy.
