= Petri Koskinen =

Finnish ice hockey player

- Born: April 28, 1983 (age 41); Tampere, FIN
- Height: 5 ft 10 in (178 cm)
- Weight: 187 lb (85 kg; 13 st 5 lb)
- Position: Forward
- Shoots: Left
- SM-liiga team Former teams: SaiPa; Tappara; Pelicans
- Playing career: 2003–present

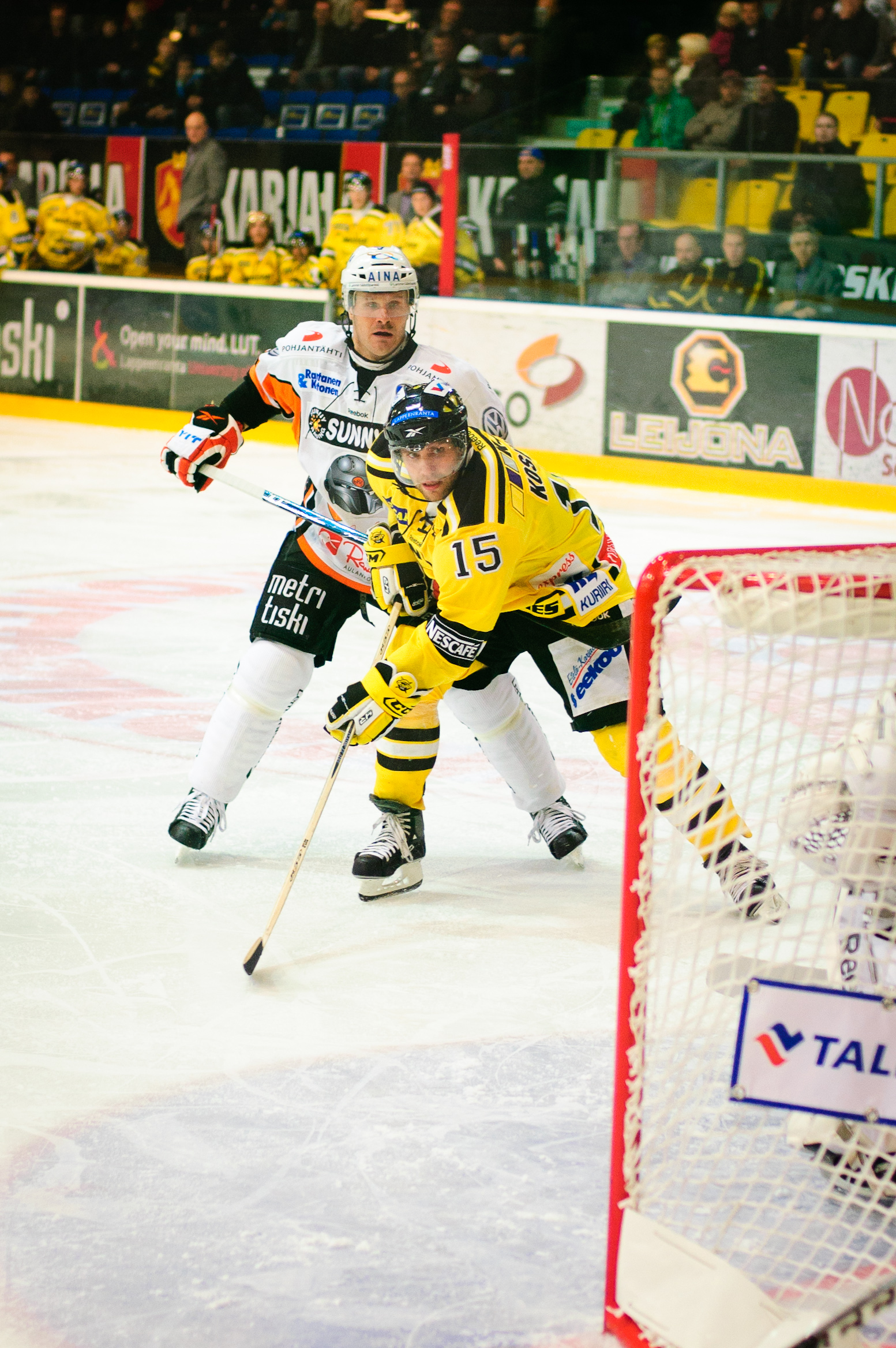
Finnish ice hockey players Petri Koskinen of SaiPa Lappeenranta and Jukka Laamanen of HPK Hämeenlinna battling for the puck in the Finnish SM-liiga.

Petri Koskinen (born April 28, 1983) is a Finnish ice hockey player who currently plays professionally in Finland for SaiPa of the SM-liiga.
