= Kalle Koskinen =

Finnish ice hockey player

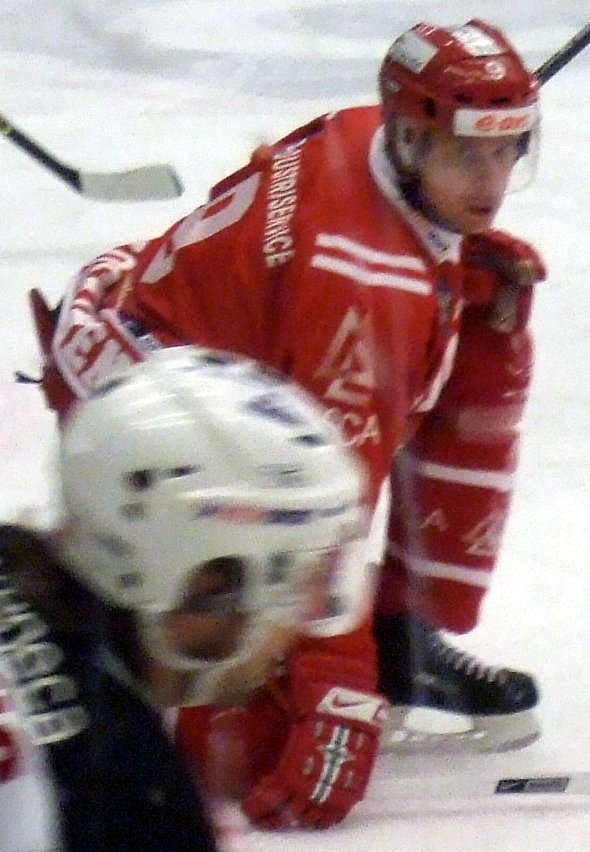
- Born: January 3, 1972 (age 53); Jyväskylä, FIN
- Height: 6 ft 3 in (191 cm)
- Weight: 205 lb (93 kg; 14 st 9 lb)
- Position: Defence
- Shoots: Left
- SM-liiga team Former teams: JYP; Pelicans; Timrå IK (SEL)
- Playing career: 1993–present

Kalle Koskinen (born January 3, 1972, in Jyväskylä, Finland) is a defenceman who played for the JYP hockey team in the Finnish SM-liiga. He retired at the conclusion of the 2012/13 season, after 5 seasons in his second spell with JYP Jyväskylä.
