= Koskela (surname) =

Koskela is a Finnish topographic surname meaning "a place of rapids". Notable people with the surname include:

- Harri Koskela (born 1965), Finnish wrestler
- Jari Koskela, Finnish politician
- Lauri Koskela (1907–1944), Finnish wrestler
- Niina Koskela (born 1971), Finnish chess grandmaster
- Pekka Koskela (born 1982), Finnish speedskater
- Pentti Koskela (1945–2024), Finnish ice hockey player
- Terho Koskela (born 1964), Swedish ice hockey player
- Tero Koskela (born 1976), Finnish footballer
- Toni Koskela (born 1983), Finnish footballer

== Fictional characters ==
- Olof Koskela, a main character of the novel The Song of the Blood-Red Flower by Johannes Linnankoski
- Multiple characters, including Vilho Koskela, in the novels by Väinö Linna
- Ilmo and Jakko Koskela, twin brothers from the fictional town of Watery, WA, in the video game Alan Wake 2
