= Lyyli Koskinen =

Finnish politician (1919–1969)

Lyyli Johanna Koskinen (21 March 1919 – 27 August 1969) was a Finnish politician, born in Korpilahti. She was a member of the Parliament of Finland from 1962 until her death in 1969, representing the Finnish People's Democratic League (SKDL). She was a member of the Communist Party of Finland (SKP). She was a presidential elector in the 1962 and 1968 presidential elections.
