= Koski Duże =

- Village
- Location within Poland
- Coordinates: 52°31′34″N 22°37′29″E
- Country: Poland
- Voivodeship: Podlaskie
- County: Siemiatycze
- Gmina: Perlejewo
- Population: 110

Koski Duże [ˈkɔski ˈduʐɛ] is a village in the administrative district of Gmina Perlejewo, within Siemiatycze County, Podlaskie Voivodeship, in north-eastern Poland.
