= Koskela Light =

Koskela Light Koskela
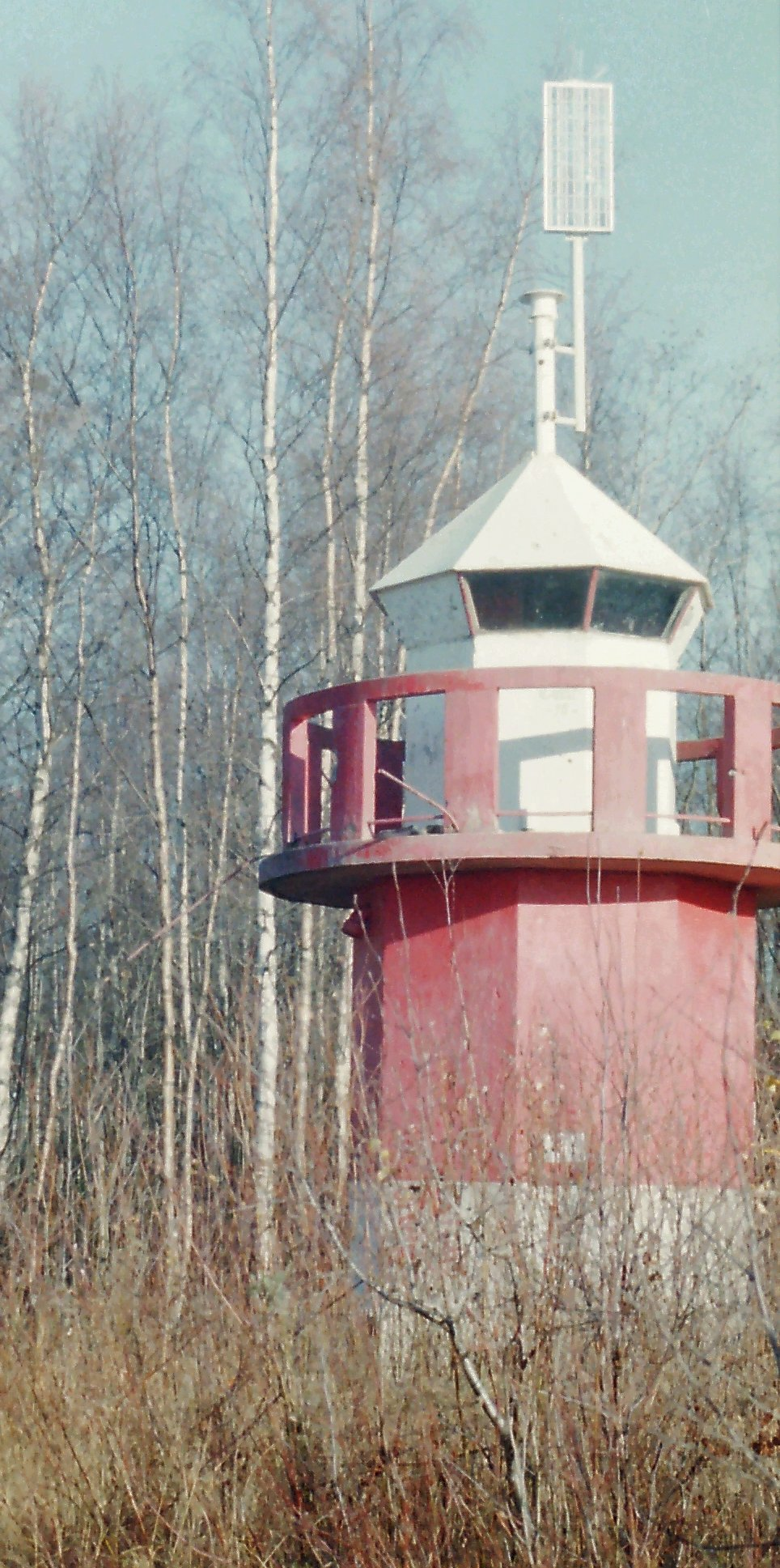
- Koskela Lighthouse in 1995
- Location: Oulu, Finland
- Coordinates: 65.0573°N 25.4017°E

Tower
- Constructed: 1939
- Construction: concrete tower
- Height: 5 metres (16 ft)
- Shape: octagonal tower with balcony and lantern
- Markings: red tower and balcony, white lantern

Light
- First lit: 1939
- Deactivated: late 1990s
- Focal height: 8 m (26 ft)
- Range: 6.6 nmi (12.2 km; 7.6 mi)
- Characteristic: Exting (1990–), Fl W 3s (–1990)

Koskela Light (Finnish: Koskelan loisto) is a sector light tower located on the southern shore of Letonniemi promontory in Taskila district of the City of Oulu in Finland. The tower is located within the boundaries of the Letonniemi natural preserve.

== History ==
The current tower was built in 1939 to guide vessels towards the Toppila harbour. It replaced an older and smaller light built in 1911; the older light was located approximately 920 metres (1,010 yd) southeast from the current tower.

The tower is 5 metres (16 ft)-high octagonal concrete structure with an octagonal steel lantern, resting on a square slab of concrete. The tower was originally painted red with a white lantern. The light displayed a flash every three seconds, green, red or white depending on direction. The focal plane was 5.7 metres (19 ft) and the range was 6.6 nautical miles (12.2 km; 7.6 mi).

The light was noted as an active light in the 1996 List of Lights of Finland, but was not mentioned in the 2000 edition.

The light was deactivated in the late 1990s and nautical charts dated in 2005 shows the light marked down as a cairn. It served as a cairn until 20 June 2023 when it was deleted from the charts.

Due to the glacial rebound the tower is located 150 yards (140 m) away from the coastline, and is almost completely hidden by the shrub. A footpath leading to the western end of the Letonniemi promontory leads next to the tower.

== Gallery ==
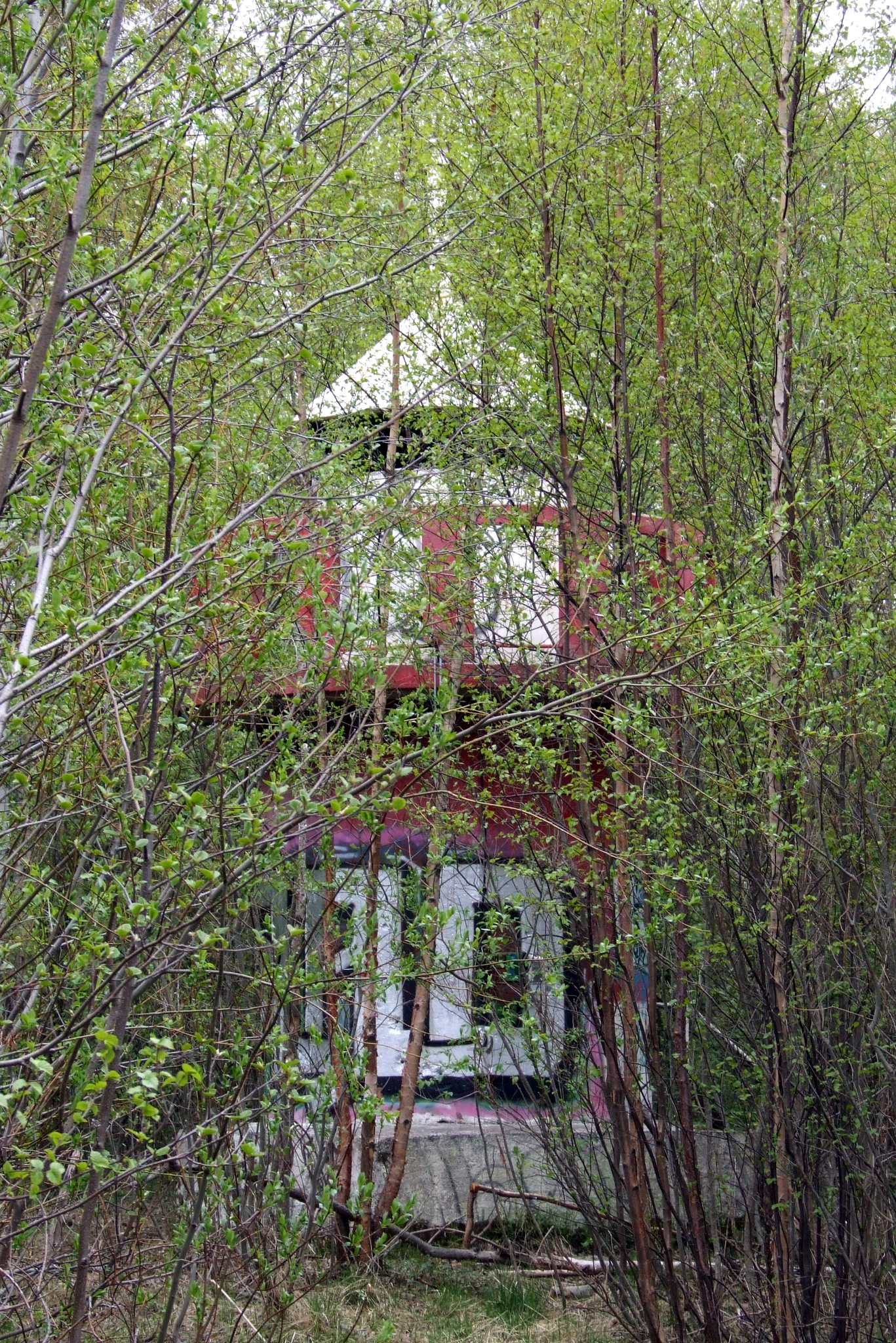
Koskela Light in May 2006

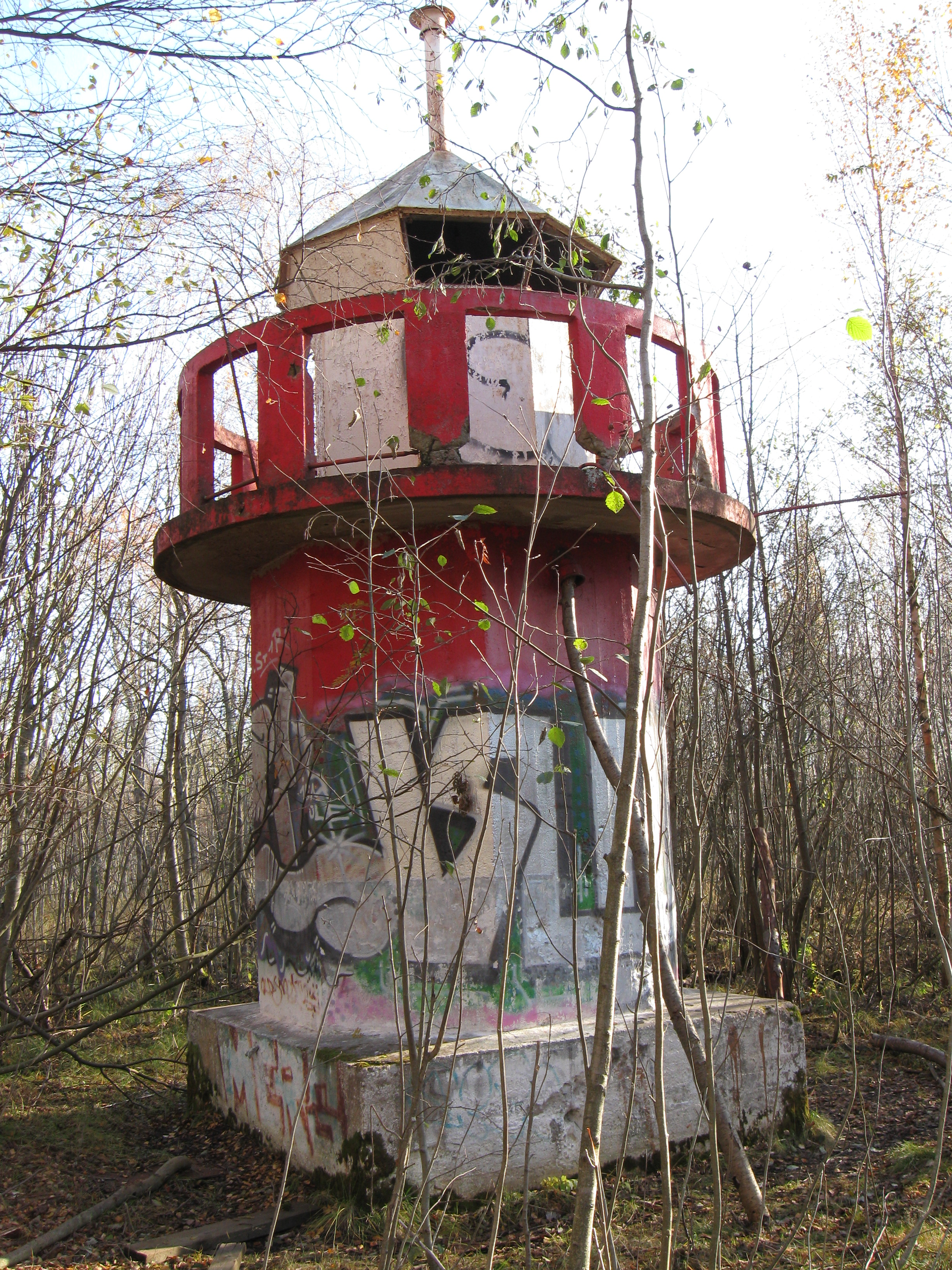
Koskela Light in October 2009
