= Siemiatycze County =

Siemiatycze County Powiat siemiatycki
- County
- Flag Coat of arms

- Location within the voivodeship
- Coordinates (Siemiatycze): 52°25′38″N 22°51′45″E
- Country: Poland
- Voivodeship: Podlaskie
- Seat: Siemiatycze
- Gminas: Total 9 (incl. 1 urban): Siemiatycze; Gmina Drohiczyn; Gmina Dziadkowice; Gmina Grodzisk; Gmina Mielnik; Gmina Milejczyce; Gmina Nurzec-Stacja; Gmina Perlejewo; Gmina Siemiatycze

Area
  - Total: 1,459.58 km^{2} (563.55 sq mi)

Population (2019)
  - Total: 44,366
  - Density: 30.396/km^{2} (78.726/sq mi)
  - Urban: 16,388
  - Rural: 27,978
- Car plates: BSI
- Website: www.siemiatycze.pl

Siemiatycze County (Polish: powiat siemiatycki) is a unit of territorial administration and local government (powiat) in Podlaskie Voivodeship, north-eastern Poland, on the border with Belarus. It came into being on January 1, 1999, as a result of the Polish local government reforms passed in 1998. Its administrative seat and largest town is Siemiatycze, which lies 80 kilometres (50 mi) south of the regional capital Białystok. The only other town in the county is Drohiczyn, lying 15 km (9 mi) west of Siemiatycze.

The county covers an area of 1,459.58 square kilometres (563.5 sq mi). As of 2019 its total population is 44,366, out of which the population of Siemiatycze is 14,418, that of Drohiczyn is 1,970, and the rural population is 27,978.

== Neighbouring counties ==
Siemiatycze County is bordered by Biała County and Łosice County to the south, Siedlce County to the south-west, Sokołów County to the west, Wysokie Mazowieckie County and Bielsk County to the north, and Hajnówka County to the north-east. It also borders Belarus to the east.

== Administrative divisions ==
The county is subdivided into nine gminas (one urban, one urban-rural and seven rural). These are listed in the following table, in descending order of population.

Gmina	Type	Area (km^{2})	Population (2019)	Seat
Siemiatycze	urban	36.3	14,418	
Gmina Drohiczyn	urban-rural	208.0	6,245	Drohiczyn
Gmina Siemiatycze	rural	227.1	6,078	Siemiatycze *
Gmina Grodzisk	rural	203.2	4,181	Grodzisk
Gmina Nurzec-Stacja	rural	215.0	3,831	Nurzec-Stacja
Gmina Perlejewo	rural	106.3	2,793	Perlejewo
Gmina Dziadkowice	rural	115.7	2,735	Dziadkowice
Gmina Mielnik	rural	196.2	2,352	Mielnik
Gmina Milejczyce	rural	151.8	1,733	Milejczyce
* seat not part of the gmina
