= Józef Maroszek (engineer) =

Polish engineer and designer of weapons

- Born: June 13 or July 13, 1904; Boglewice
- Died: January 6, 1985 (age 80); Warsaw
- Education: Warsaw University of Technology
- Awards: Order of Polonia Restituta, Cross of Merit, Medal of the 40th Anniversary of People's Poland, Honorary Badge "Meritorious for Warmia and Mazury", Gold Badge of the Polish Teachers' Union
- Scientific career
- Fields: mechanical engineering, technical sciences

Józef Maroszek (born 1904 in Boglewice, died 6 January 1985 in Warsaw) was a Polish engineer, designer of weapons and mechanical devices. He was professionally affiliated for most of his career with the Warsaw University of Technology and the Military Institute of Armament Technology.

Maroszek was the creator of designs such as the Kbsp wz. 38M and the wz. 35 anti-tank rifle, among the most advanced weapons in the Polish Army's arsenal before World War II.

After the war, he spent several decades as an academic lecturer at the Faculty of Mechanical Technology at the Warsaw University of Technology and served as the head of the "C" Machine Parts Department.

== Biography ==
Józef Maroszek was born on 13 June or 13 July 1904 in Boglewice near Grójec. He came from a farming family; his father was Paweł Oktawian Maroszek, and his mother was Franciszka née Małachowska. He had eight siblings. Maroszek was married twice – his first wife was Helena née Piątkowska (1899–1961), and his second was Maria Karolina née Szczęsna (1912–1995).

After completing primary school in Boglewice, Maroszek moved to Warsaw, where he graduated from the Stefan Chrupczałowski Gymnasium. He obtained his secondary school diploma from the Boys' Gymnasium of the Polish Secondary School Teachers' Union. During his gymnasium years, he built a miniature steam engine with a boiler crafted from a 155 mm cartridge case. The engine was equipped with a dynamo that supplied electricity to a connected light bulb.

=== Designer of firearms ===
In 1923, Józef Maroszek began his studies at the Faculty of Mechanical Engineering and Design at the Warsaw University of Technology. He received a scholarship from the Minister of Military Affairs to prepare his diploma thesis titled Technological Simplification of Domestically Produced Rifles. This work led to the development of the Karabinek KP-32, a thoroughly redesigned version of the kbk wz. 29, constructed at the State Rifle Factory. Although Maroszek's design never entered mass production, it drew the attention of military authorities. Before completing his studies, on 9 August 1931, Maroszek married Helena née Piątkowska, a 30-year-old widow. On 18 April 1932, he earned the degree of mechanical engineer.

After graduation, Maroszek was employed at the Military Institute of Armament Technology in Warsaw. For several months, he refined his Karabinek KP-32 project, revisiting it again between 1935 and 1936. However, its flaws could not be fully resolved, and the prototype was ultimately not selected for production.

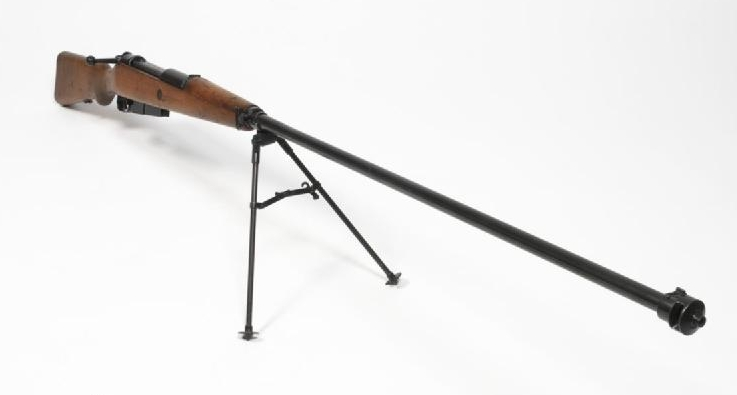
Wz. 35 anti-tank rifle is sometimes mistakenly referred to in foreign publications as the "Maroszek rifle", after the name of its principal designer

Between 1934 and 1935, Maroszek initiated work on a new anti-tank rifle design, later adopted by the Polish Armed Forces as the wz. 35 anti-tank rifle. By late 1935 and early 1936, a trial batch of prototypes was produced. The innovative design of this rifle, featuring a muzzle brake, proved far more effective at piercing armor than traditional designs and was nearly half the weight. In 1937, the rifle entered secret mass production, continuing until the outbreak of World War II.

In parallel, the Military Institute of Armament Technology announced a competition in 1934 for Poland's first domestically designed semi-automatic rifle. Maroszek's "Turniej" rifle, alongside two other designs, progressed to advanced testing, and in 1936, it was selected as the sole design for further development. By 1938, the refined Kbsp wz. 38M entered production, but only 150 units of the trial series were manufactured before the war disrupted further production.

One of Maroszek's lesser-known projects was a training variant of the Browning wz. 28, adapted for the cheaper .22 long rifle ammunition. While he created a prototype, it never advanced to mass production.

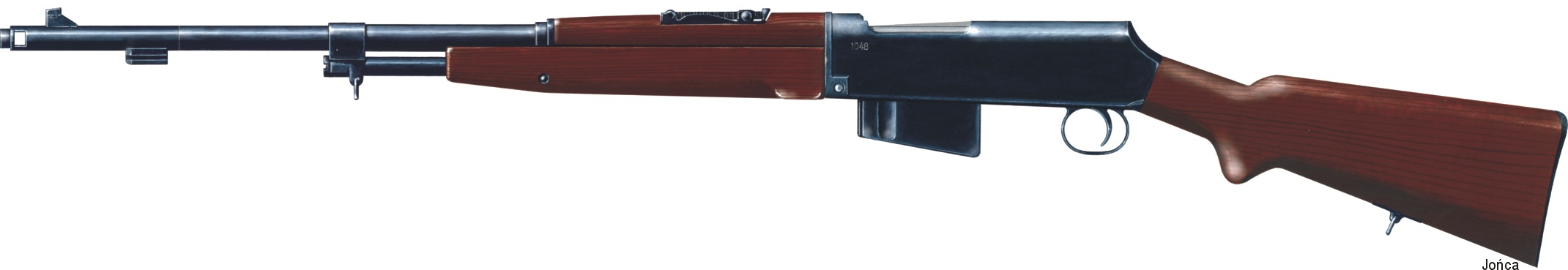
It is believed that only six examples of the wz. 38 rifle have survived, two of which are in Poland: one at the Polish Army Museum and the other at the Warsaw Rising Museum

When war broke out, Maroszek and the Military Institute of Armament Technology staff were evacuated eastward. On 16 September 1939, their evacuation train was attacked by the Luftwaffe near Zdolbuniv in Volhynia. According to Maroszek, he used his personal wz. 38M semi-automatic rifle to fire at attacking aircraft, reportedly forcing one to land with the pilot severely wounded and the gunner fatally shot. This remains the only known account of the wz. 38M being used during the September Campaign.

After Poland's occupation by Soviet and German forces, Maroszek returned to Warsaw. From December 1939, he worked as a foreman at H. Zieleziński's mechanical plant in Praga, assisting in rebuilding Warsaw's power plant after war damage. In 1940, the Polish government-in-exile sought to bring Maroszek to France to refine his anti-tank rifle for use against more heavily armored vehicles. However, after reaching Kraków, the courier tasked with helping him cross the Hungarian border was arrested by the Gestapo. Maroszek avoided capture and returned to Warsaw. In June 1942, he began working for Stanisław Krasuski's company, managing the mechanical processing division. He later worked in a motorcycle repair workshop and for Kukier and Lisowski's firm.

During this time, Maroszek collaborated with the resistance movement. He manufactured springs and spare parts for captured weapons in his apartment and helped transport these materials to storage locations. He was injured during the Warsaw Uprising. After its fall, he was transferred through transition camps in Pruszków and Skierniewice to relatives in Sadurki. By March 1945, he returned to Warsaw to his surviving apartment in Mokotów.

=== Academic career ===
Shortly after the war, Józef Maroszek began collaborating with Władysław Kukier's company. However, Professor Wacław Moszyński soon recruited him to help organize the newly established Łódź University of Technology, and the two later returned to Warsaw. On 1 October 1948, Maroszek started working as a senior assistant in Professor Moszyński's department at the Warsaw University of Technology, eventually becoming an associate professor. After the war, he abandoned his work on firearms and focused on teaching subjects such as machine design fundamentals and technical drawing. On 1 August 1950, he joined the Polish Committee for Standardization. In 1951, he became the head of the "C" Machine Parts Department at the Faculty of Mechanical Technology. Maroszek was widowed in 1961 and remarried two years later to Maria Karolina Szczęsna.

During the post-war years, Maroszek patented approximately 10 inventions, including a door lock of his design (filed on 10 April 1954), a "keyless latch lock for doors" (27 October 1960), a "vent lock" (21 January 1961), and a "row seat" for the Polish Theatre in Warsaw (31 August 1961). Between the 1960s and 1970s, he published three academic manuals: engineering drawing (1969), fasteners (1974), and mechanical transmissions (1971).

On 25 November 1975, Maroszek retired but remained professionally active. He contributed to investigations, such as providing expertise on the tragic 1979 Warsaw gas explosion. For this work, he drew upon calculations he had performed decades earlier during his doctoral research on muzzle brakes, a feature he had implemented in his anti-tank rifle design. He also continued revising his academic manuals and corresponded with military historians, including Janusz Magnuski, documenting the history of his pre-war designs.

Józef Maroszek passed away on the 6th of January, 1985 in Warsaw at the age of 80 and was buried at Wawrzyszew Cemetery.

== Awards, distinctions, and decorations ==
- Knight's Cross of the Order of Polonia Restituta (1971)
- Gold Cross of Merit (1935, 1954)
- Medal of the 40th Anniversary of People's Poland
- Badge of Merit for the Warsaw University of Technology
- Gold Honorary Badge "Meritorious for Warmia and Mazury" (1965)
- Gold Badge of the Polish Teachers' Union (1974)

== Bibliography ==
- Gwóźdź, Zbigniew; Zarzycki, Piotr (1993). Polskie konstrukcje broni strzeleckiej [Polish Firearm Designs] (in Polish). Warsaw: SIGMA NOT. ISBN 83-85001-69-7.
- Maroszek, Józef (2013). "Wspomnienie o profesorze Politechniki Warszawskiej inż. Józefie Maroszku (1904-1985), konstruktorze karabinów samopowtarzalnych wz. 32, wz. 38 „M" i przeciwpancernego „UR" wz. 35" [A Tribute to Warsaw University of Technology Professor, Engineer Józef Maroszek (1904–1985), Designer of the Semi-Automatic Rifles wz. 32, wz. 38 "M," and the Anti-Tank Rifle wz. 35 "UR"]. In Dajnowicz, Małgorzata; Miodowski, Adam; Wesołowski, Tomasz (eds.). Społeczeństwo, wojsko, polityka: studia i szkice ofiarowane profesorowi Adamowi Czesławowi Dobrońskiemu w okazji 70 urodzin [Society, Military, Politics: Studies and Essays Presented to Professor Adam Czesław Dobroński on the Occasion of His 70th Birthday] (in Polish). Białystok: PRYMAT. hdl:11320/411. ISBN 978-83-7657-192-8.
