= Karabinek KP-32 =

The Karabinek KP-32 was a prototype of a bolt-action repeating carbine. Designed in 1932 by Józef Maroszek as his academic thesis at the Faculty of Engineering of Warsaw University of Technology, it was a thorough modification of the Karabinek wz. 1929 carbine, itself based on the German Mauser rifle. Its main advantage was simplification and reduced cost.

Several prototypes were made by the Państwowa Fabryka Karabinów works in Warsaw. The Polish Army initially ordered 66 pieces for testing, but eventually dismissed the design and the project was scrapped. However, Maroszek's efforts did not go to waste: he soon scaled up his bolt action to develop Wz. 35 anti-tank rifle, and it might also have influenced the design of PTRD-41.
