= Kbsp wz. 38M =

Polish semi-automatic rifle

karabin samopowtarzalny wz. 38M
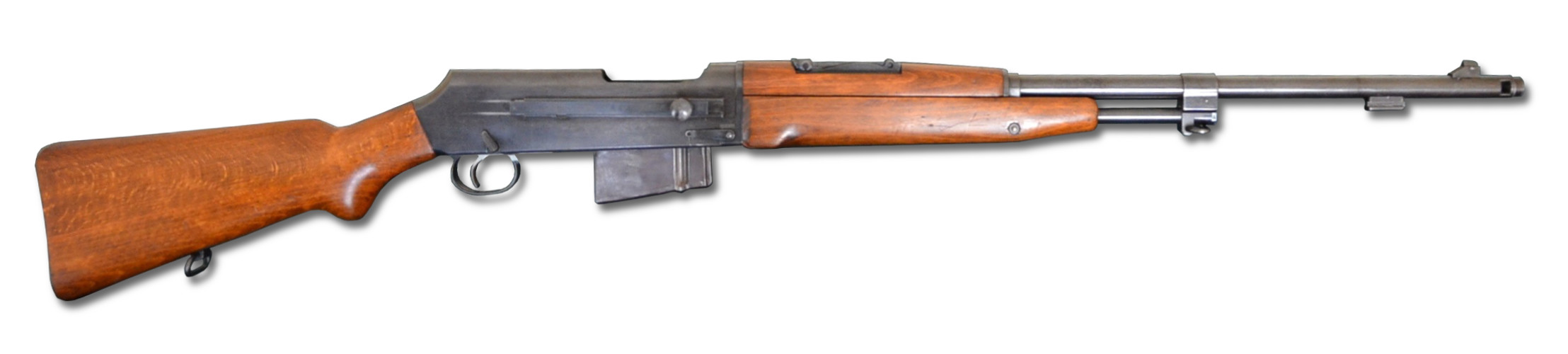
- Type: Semi-automatic rifle
- Place of origin: Poland

Service history
- In service: 1938–1939 (as test weapon)
- Used by: Poland; Germany (captured)
- Wars: World War II

Production history
- Designer: Józef Maroszek
- Designed: 1934–1937
- Produced: 1938–1939 (information series)
- No. built: ~ 150

Specifications
- Mass: 4.5 kg (9.9 lb)
- Length: 1,134 mm (44.6 in)
- Barrel length: 625 mm (24.6 in)
- Cartridge: 7.92×57mm Mauser
- Caliber: 7.9mm
- Action: Gas-Operated, Tilt locked
- Muzzle velocity: 808 m/s (2,650 ft/s)
- Feed system: 10-round internal box magazine

The karabin samopowtarzalny wzór 38M (self-repeating rifle pattern 1938M, abbreviated kbsp wz. 38M), is a 7.92mm semi-automatic rifle used in small numbers by the Polish Army during the Polish Campaign of World War II.

== History ==
The rifle was designed by a Polish engineer Józef Maroszek (1904-1985). He was known mainly as a designer of the successful wz. 35 anti-tank rifle. Maroszek was one of the three winners of Poland’s 1934 self-loading rifle trials. Several prototypes and pre-production samples of his rifle were manufactured from 1936 to 1938. After a Polish army order was received, small scale production began in 1938. It is believed only about 150 rifles of this pattern were completed before the outbreak of the Second World War. Production was not resumed under the German occupation. The wz. 38M rifles were manufactured by the Zbrojownia Nr. 2 (Arsenal No.2) in Warsaw (Praga). Barrels were supplied by the Państwowa Fabryka Karabinów (State Rifle Factory) in Warsaw.

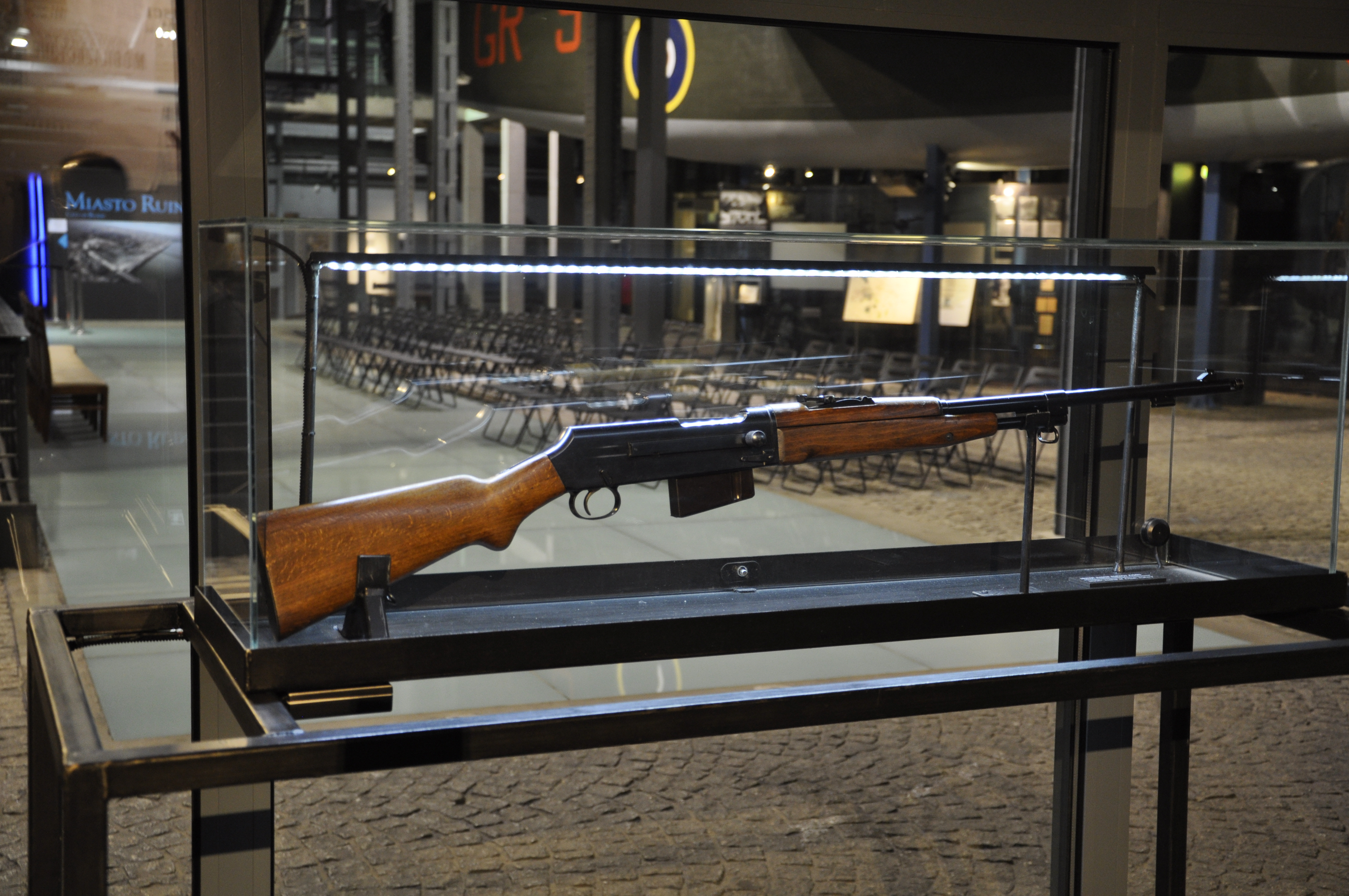
kbsp wz. 38M serial no. 1019 in Warsaw Rising Museum

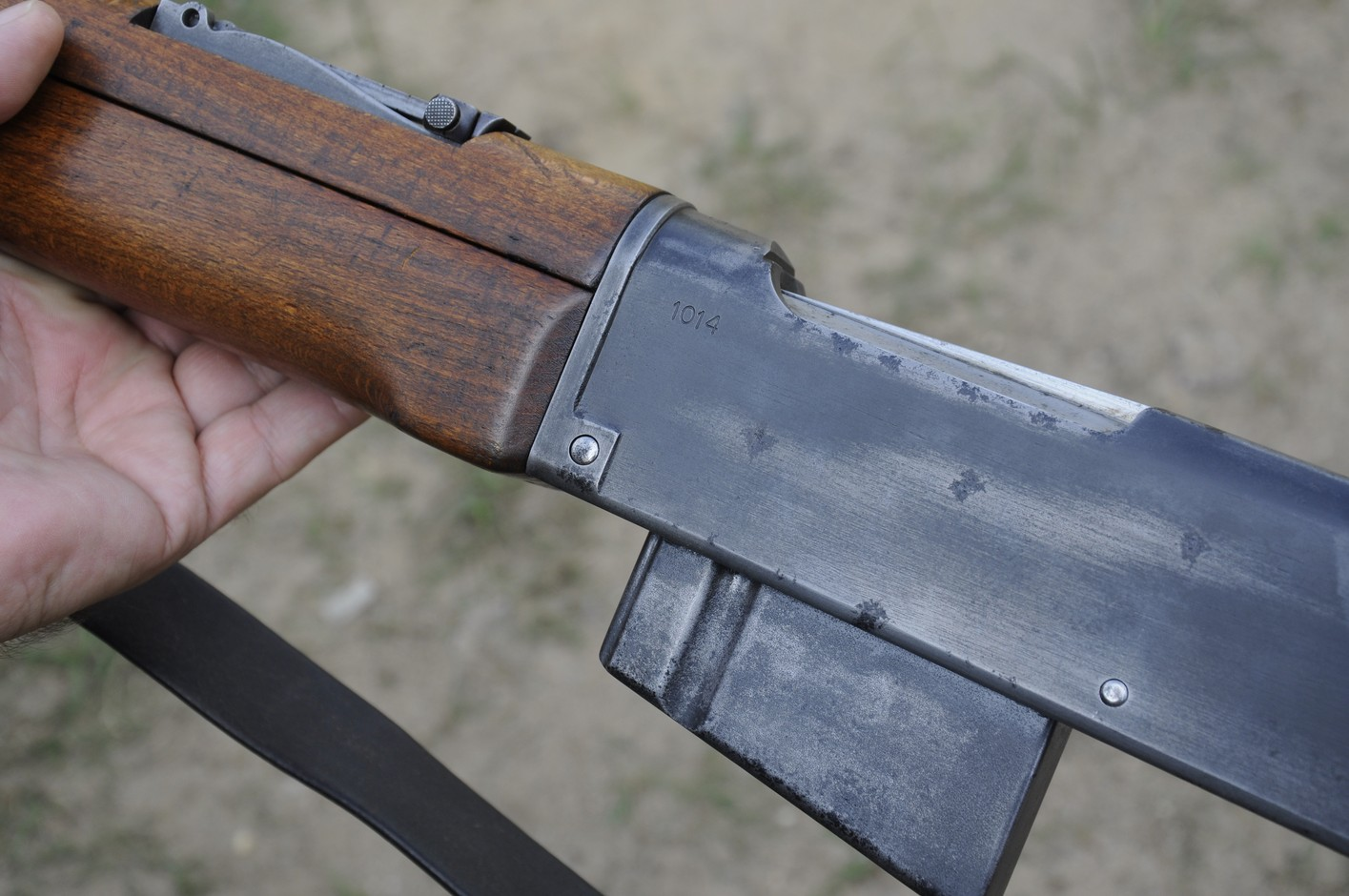
kbsp wz. 38M rifle with serial no. 1014

The highest serial number observed is 1054 (it is assumed numbering started from "1001", not counting the prototypes and pre-production examples). The decision was made to begin serial production of the rifle at the Fabryka Broni arms factory in Radom in 1938. However, it is unclear if any rifles of this pattern left the Radom factory before the German invasion (all the surviving examples display Arsenal Nr. 2's "Zbr.2" markings). Maroszek stated he had seen a group of German soldiers armed with wz. 38M rifles in occupied Warsaw. This is perhaps the only indication that the rifles were reissued to German troops.

The rifle is gas operated with the gas tube located under the barrel. It features a Browning/Petter system in which the bolt tilts up to lock; in the case of the kbsp wz. 38M, against the front edge of the ejection/loading aperture in the top of the receiver. It has a ten-round non-detachable magazine loaded from Mauser stripper clips. The safety lever is located on the right side of the receiver, just above the trigger. The rifle has a Mauser-style tangent leaf rear sight graduated from 300 to 2,000 m (330 to 2,190 yd). The bayonet lug accepts a standard Polish issue wz. 29, and the barrel is equipped with a muzzle brake to ameliorate recoil. For a pioneering self-loading rifle, its design is strikingly advanced in its simplicity and functionality; for example, it's composed of several sub-sections interlocked by a single removable steel pin, and thus can be disassembled in moments. When the last round is fired, bolt is locked back. Rifle has also interesting function similar to Czechoslovak ZH-29, where if the gun is loaded with charger clips the bolt can be released into battery with trigger pull. There is also a non-reciprocating charging handle located at the right side of the rifle.

Today, this is a difficult to find military rifle on the collector market. There are only nine known examples in collections around the world (1. Polish Army Museum, Warsaw, Poland, deactivated; 2. Central Armed Forces Museum, Moscow, Russia; 3, 4, 5, 6, 7, 8. private collections in the United States; 9. private collection in Germany). The known serial numbers are: 1014, 1017, 1019, 1027, 1030, 1040, 1048, 1054. (The Russian museum and the Ohio collection rifles serial numbers are unknown.)

In April 2017, serial number 1048 was acquired at auction in excellent condition by the Polish Ministry of National Defence for $69,000. A representative of the ministry announced that the rifle would be exhibited at the Polish Army Museum.

== Relation about combat usage ==
According to the Maroszek relation, while personnel were evacuating from Instytut Techniki Uzbrojenia (Weaponry Technology Institute) the train they were traveling in was attacked near the city of Zdołbunów by two German warplanes flying at low altitude. As he states in his memoirs, Maroszek kept shooting through the window by his wz. 38M rifle, eventually killing the gunner and wounding the pilot of one of the planes, forcing it to land.

== See also ==
- ZH-29
