= Sts. Apostles Peter and Paul Church (Siematycze) =

Orthodox church in Siemiatycze, Poland

- Cerkiew Świętych Apostołów Piotra i Pawła
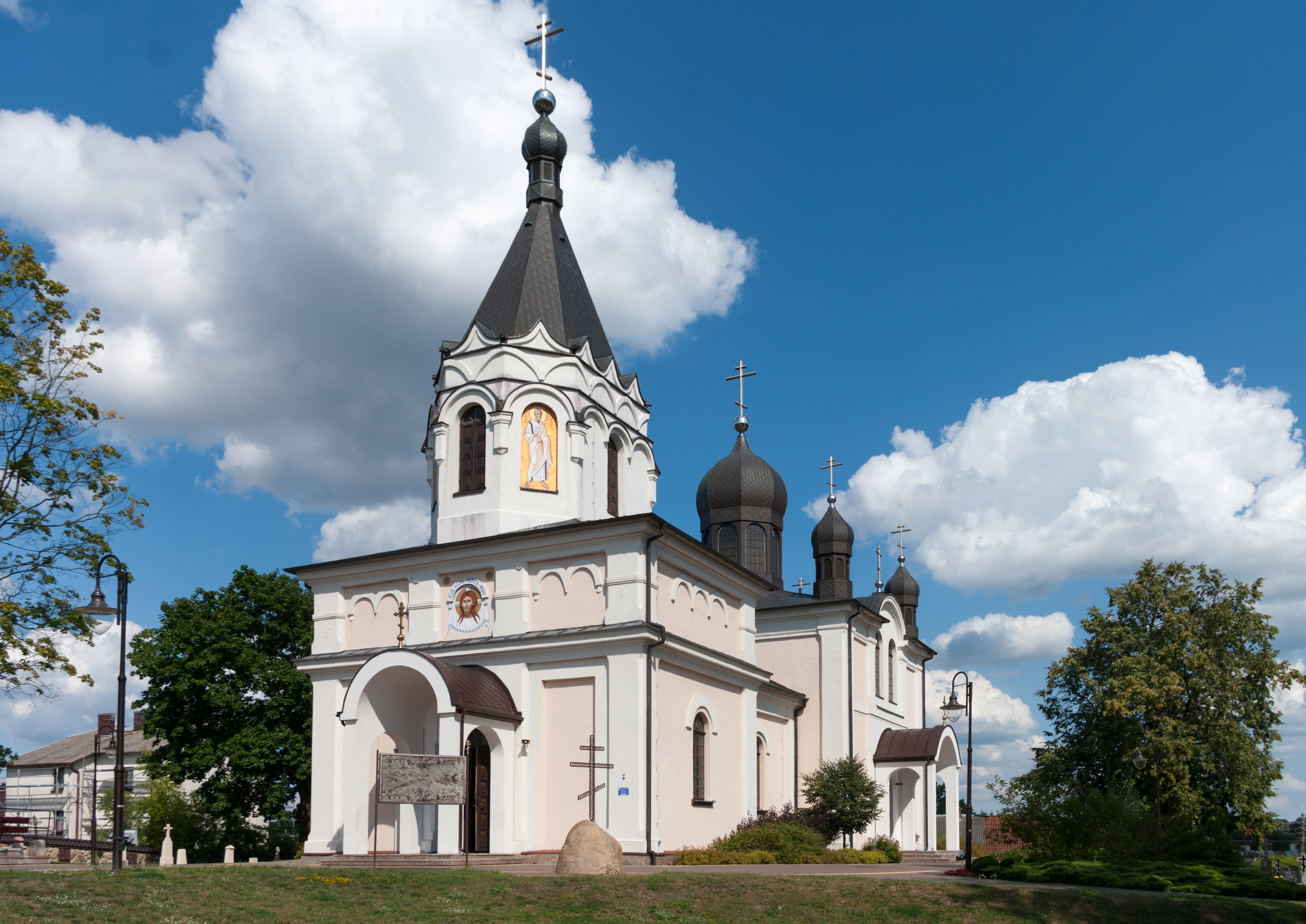
- Sts. Apostles Peter and Paul Church
- 52°25′51.9″N 22°51′51.0″E
- Location: Siemiatycze
- Country: Poland
- Denomination: Eastern Orthodoxy
- Churchmanship: Polish Orthodox Church

History
- Status: active Orthodox church
- Dedication: Saints Peter and Paul
- Dedicated: November 6, 1866

Architecture
- Architect: project from Konstantin Thon's design catalog
- Style: Russian Revival
- Years built: 1865–1866

Specifications
- Materials: brick

Administration
- Diocese: Diocese of Warsaw and Bielsk

The Sts. Apostles Peter and Paul Church is an Orthodox parish church located in Siemiatycze, belonging to the Siemiatycze Deanery of the Diocese of Warsaw and Bielsk of the Polish Orthodox Church.

The first church in Siemiatycze was established in the 15th century and served as a parish church from the beginning. It officially became property of the Uniate Church immediately after the signing of the Union of Brest, effectively transitioning in 1614. A new wooden Uniate church in Siemiatycze was funded in the same century by Lew Sapieha. The temple became an important pilgrimage center on Trinity Sunday, originally its patronal feast. Over time, its significance in the town diminished, and the Uniate parish gradually became impoverished.

In 1839, the Siemiatycze parish was compelled to return to Orthodox faith, following the decisions of the Synod of Polotsk. Although the 17th-century church was already in poor condition by then, a brick Orthodox temple was built in Siemiatycze only after the suppression of the January Uprising, largely funded by the Russian state. The building remained active until 1915 when the Orthodox inhabitants of the town went into exile. During the interwar period, the church was reopened and has been continuously active since.

Inside the church, there is an iconostasis from 1908, along with Baroque icons of Saints Peter and Paul and St. Paraskeva.

The church is situated on Powstania Styczniowego Street, on a hill overlooking the Muchawiec stream, a tributary of the Kamianka river. The churchyard, surrounded by a wall, also served as a cemetery (part of the historic tombstones have survived), where Orthodox clergy are currently buried.

== History ==
=== First Orthodox church in Siemiatycze ===
The Orthodox church in Siemiatycze existed in the first half of the 15th century and may have been founded by the owner of Siemiatycze, Olechno Kmita Sudymontowicz, along with his wife, Fedora. However, the founding document of Olechno Kmita Sudymontowicz from 1431 is considered by many scholars to be a forgery. According to Józef Maroszek, it was likely falsified in the 17th or 18th century, perhaps to convince the heiress of Siemiatycze, Anna Jabłonowska, of the legitimacy of the local clergyman's income. (Note: The Polish Orthodox cleric and theologian, Grzegorz Sosna, who specializes in the history of the Orthodox Church in Podlachia, argues that historians J. Maroszek and J. Wiśniewski deny the authenticity of the document due to their confessional biases, unwilling to acknowledge that Orthodox structures were established in the region before the Catholic ones. Conversely, M. Kałamajska-Saeed contends that the falseness of the known founding document does not imply that the church was not genuinely built during a similar period.)

There is no doubt that the church existed in 1456 when Olechno's son, Michał Kmita, financed the renovation of the building and gifted meadows and arable land in Myszkowo to the local parish. In 1513, his daughter, Aleksandra Tęczyńska, confirmed the parish's rights to all previously granted endowments. Analyzing her record allows to conclude that, in addition to the parish church of the Holy Trinity (with side altars of Saints Peter and Paul and St. Paraskeva), there was also a chapel of St. Anne in Siemiatycze, which may have occupied the site of the current Catholic chapel dedicated to the same saint.

According to Maroszek, it is possible that an original settlement was located near the church, from which the town of Siemiatycze was established in 1542. The existence of an Orthodox parish there is again confirmed in documents from 1592. The church served as the center of the "Russian" district, contrasting with the "Lack" district focused around the Catholic church founded in 1456. This situation, with two clearly distinct ethnically and confessionally parts of one town, was typical for the region.

=== Uniate period ===
In the first phase of the town's development, the church, alongside the church and manor, was the most important element of its architecture; by the 16th century, the church, like the manor, was situated outside the proper layout of the town. In subsequent centuries, the church's location on the outskirts, contrary to the town's development trends, was linked to the expansionist activities of the Catholic church following the Council of Trent.

In 1596, after the conclusion of the Union of Brest, the Siemiatycze parish accepted its terms. This was influenced by the stance of the local landowner, Lew Sapieha, a promoter of the church union, as well as the fact that it belonged to the Eparchy of Volodymyr and Brest, whose ordinary was a supporter of the union, Hypatius Pociej. The formal change of jurisdiction was sealed in 1614 when the parish was taken over by Father Eleferiusz Kętrzyński, recommended by the Uniate bishop of Volodymyr and Brest. Thirteen years later, in an act of presentation given to the next priest, Aleksander Oladowski, he was obliged to remain faithful to the union. Lew Sapieha funded a new wooden Uniate church in Siemiatycze and instructed in his will that it should continue to function under this jurisdiction.

The Siemiatycze church became a significant pilgrimage center, especially on the patronal feast of the Holy Trinity. However, after a new church was opened in the town in 1638, the main celebrations began to take place there. The Uniate priest would conduct the Divine Liturgy in his church in the morning and was then required to attend mass in the Catholic church. Over time, the church ceased to celebrate its patronal feast in a particularly solemn manner. The patrons of the building remained the patrons of the side altars – Saints Peter and Paul and St. Paraskeva. A change in dedication occurred after 1726; the visitation protocol from that year still indicated the dedication to the Holy Trinity, but before 1789, in the subsequent protocol, new patrons were mentioned, although in 1774 the church still attracted significant groups of believers on Trinity Sunday.

The visitation protocol of the Uniate church in Siemiatycze describes the church as wooden, with a freestanding bell tower. The building had two domes with crosses that were leaning due to old age. The royal doors were described as "decent". Seven years later, the owner of Siemiatycze, Michał Sapieha, announced plans to build a new church in place of the existing one due to its poor technical condition, but he did not fulfill his promises. In the visitation protocol conducted in 1774 by Father Antoni Karczewski, it was recorded that the building required extensive repairs. Fifteen years later, records from the consistory of the Eparchy of Chełm–Belz noted that 2,511 people attended the church in Siemiatycze, including 458 residents of the town; the rest came from 16 surrounding villages. In the 18th century, the importance of the church in the town's layout further declined.

In the 18th century, the appearance of the church in Siemiatycze underwent gradual Latinization, although the iconostasis remained. Latin began to appear in the services. During periods when there were no Uniate priests in the church, Roman Catholic priests served there. The visitation protocol from 1774 indicates the emergence of an unknown Byzantine tradition of celebrating quiet masses at the side altars of Christ the Savior, the Mother of God, St. Paraskeva, and Saints Peter and Paul.

After the Third Partition of Poland, Siemiatycze fell under Prussian rule in New East Prussia. Following the establishment of the Uniate Diocese of Suprasl in the area, the Siemiatycze parish fell under its jurisdiction and remained there until 1809. In that year, a decree by Tsar Alexander I (two years earlier, New East Prussia had been annexed to the Russian Empire according to the Treaty of Tilsit) abolished the Suprasl diocese and reintegrated its pastoral institutions into the Brest diocese. Within the Russian Empire, elements of Latin origin were gradually eliminated from the Uniate church. The ritual unification was a preparation for incorporating Uniate structures into the Russian Orthodox Church, which ultimately occurred at the Synod of Polotsk in 1839. At that time, the church in Siemiatycze again became an Orthodox temple. At the time of the change in confession, the parish was poor, which also affected the appearance and furnishings of the church.

=== Orthodox church from 1840 to 1864 ===
From 1840, the Orthodox church in Siemiatycze belonged to the Drohiczyn Deanery of the Diocese of Lithuania. In 1851, the number of parishioners was estimated at 2,782 (with 386 from Siemiatycze), and by 1861, the number had risen to 2,846.

On the eve of the January Uprising (1863–1864), the rectory of the church became a meeting point for future participants in the anti-tsarist rebellion and for organizing military units. This occurred despite the disapproving stance of the local priest, Father Lacewicz, who later described Siemiatycze as a gathering point for Polish revolutionaries and a place of preparation for rebellion. Although Father Lacewicz did not support the conspirators' meetings at the rectory, he also did not inform Russian authorities that Orthodox parishioners were reading illegal Polish patriotic literature. After the uprising broke out, Father Lacewicz was captured by a Polish unit but was released following the intervention of the local Catholic parish priest, Father Roch Boguszewski. Out of gratitude for his assistance, after the rebels' defeat in the Battle of Siemiatycze, the Orthodox priest convinced the Russian army not to destroy the Siemiatycze Catholic church.

=== Construction and operation of the brick Orthodox church in the Russian Empire ===
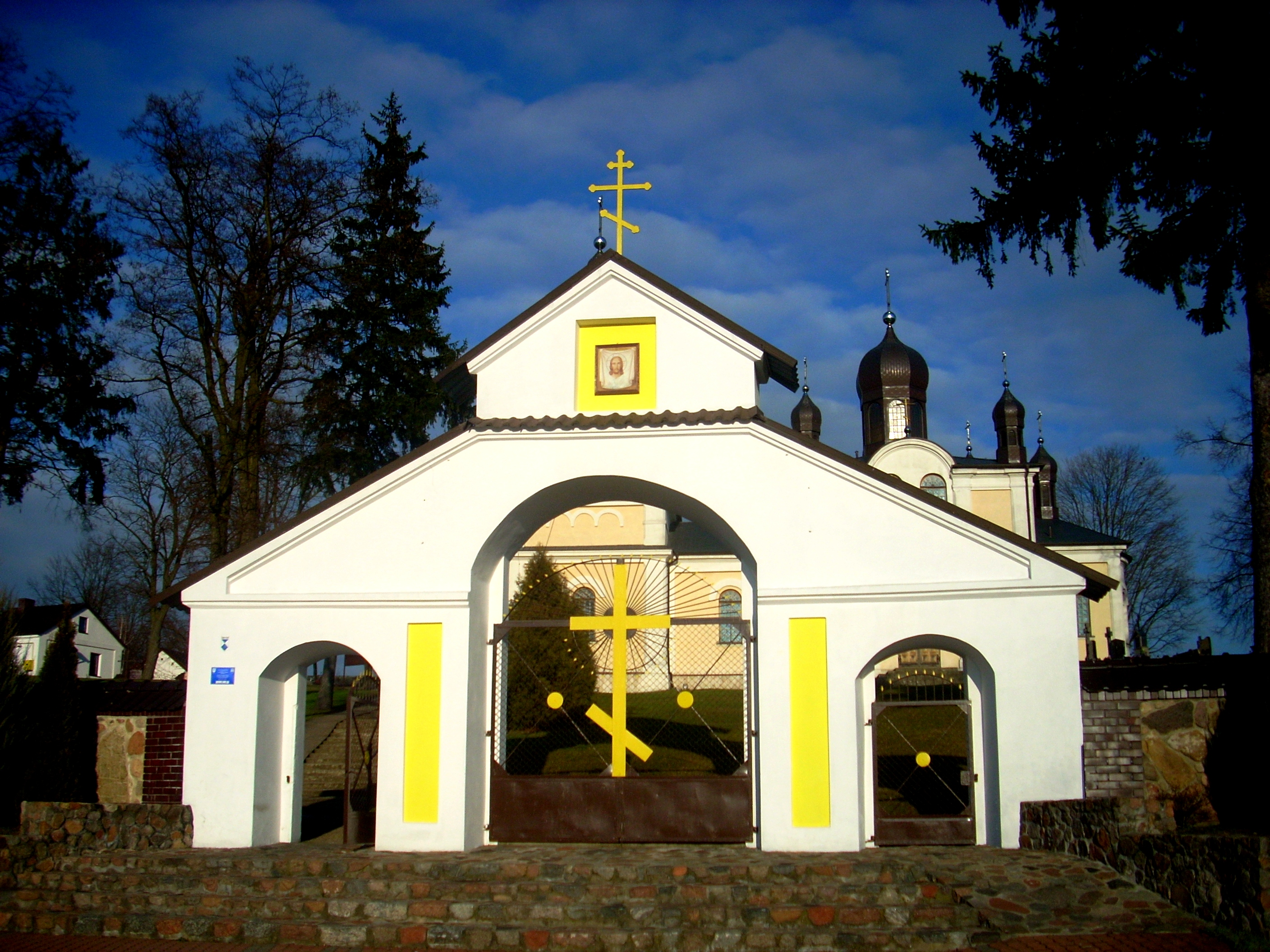
Church gate built in 1890

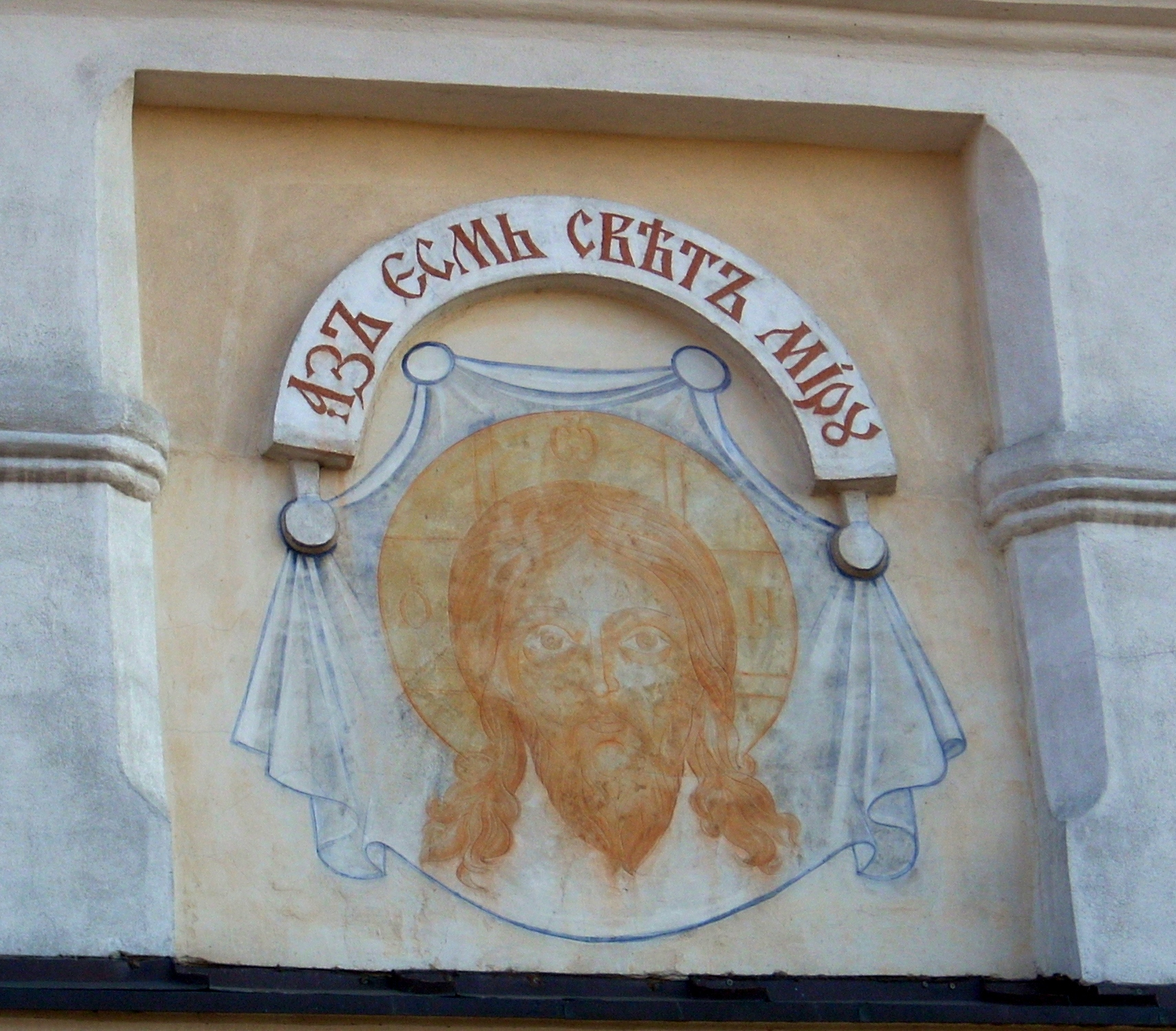
Icon of the Acheiropoieta above the entrance to the church

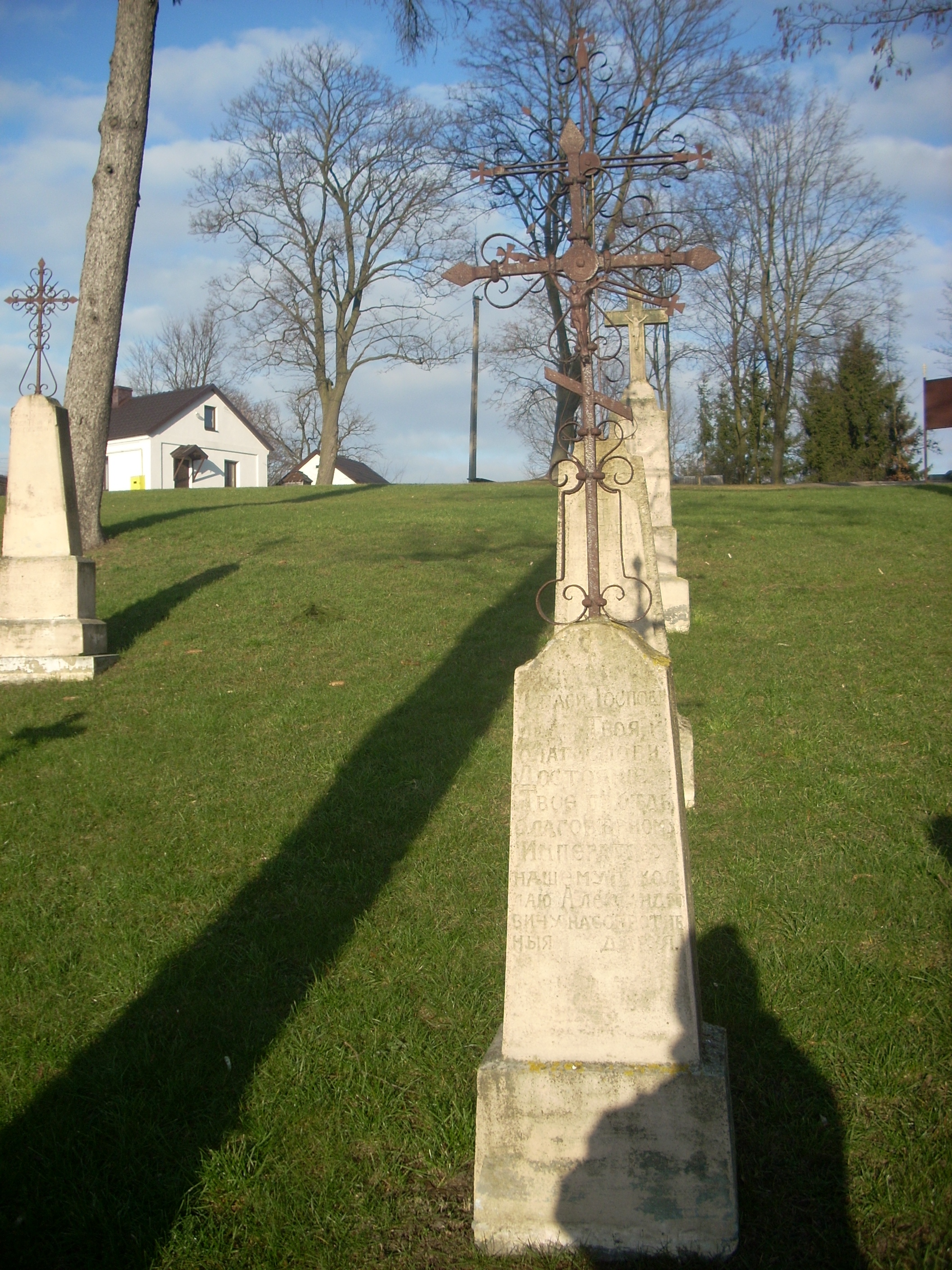
Historic tombstones and memorial crosses near the church in Siemiatycze. In the foreground, there is a cross with an inscription of a prayer for Tsar Nicholas II

By the 1860s, the deteriorating wooden church in Siemiatycze was in danger of collapsing. Described as "in complete ruin" with a thatched roof by P. Bobrowski, it became clear that a new structure was necessary. In 1865, construction began on a new brick church next to the existing one. The building was completed within a year, and on 6 November 1866, the new church was dedicated, retaining the original dedication. Initially, the new brick church functioned alongside the old one, which was later dismantled. A commemorative stone was placed where the altar of the old wooden church once stood, to the south of the new building.

The construction of the new church was funded through several sources: 3,000 rubles from the Russian state treasury, a donation from Bishop Ignacy of Brest, and contributions from parishioners, who also provided free labor. Local brickmakers, Ciecierski and Fanshawe, donated 25,000 bricks each, while 10,000 bricks came from the demolition of parts of a former Catholic monastery. According to some sources, the 3,000 rubles state grant came from a forced contribution levied on the residents of Siemiatycze, and the brick donations were also imposed on the owners.

In subsequent years, the church grounds were enclosed with a stone and brick fence, and in 1890, an ornate gate with an icon of the Holy Trinity was added. That same year, a new altar cross was installed inside the church. During the 1890s, the church underwent significant renovations, costing 1,600 rubles. On 16 October 1897, the renovated church was rededicated. The church's interior was enriched with new processional banners, candleholders, wooden kliros, and several new icons of saints.

After the establishment of the Eparchy of Grodno and Vawkavysk, the Siemiatycze church became part of its administrative structures. In 1906, it was visited by Bishop Michael of Grodno, and in the following seven years, the church's furnishings were further enhanced with a new iconostasis (completed in 1908), additional icons, and three bells. By 1905, the parish served 5,177 people. Following the issuance of the Edict of Toleration, which permitted religious conversions, 70 members of the Siemiatycze parish converted to Catholicism, along with 340 from the entire parish.

At the end of the 19th century, Orthodox Christians made up less than 10% of the population of Siemiatycze, where Jews dominated, comprising 75%. Just before World War I, the parish had 6,625 members from Siemiatycze and 22 surrounding villages.

The church was closed in 1915 when the clergy and most parishioners fled during the mass exile. During the German occupation, the church was used as a storage facility.

=== Interwar period ===
After Poland regained independence, and Orthodox Christians returned from the wartime exile, the Siemiatycze parish resumed its activities. During the interwar period, it belonged to the Siemiatycze Deanery of the Eparchy of Grodno and Vawkavysk. In 1921, Orthodox Christians made up 9% of the town’s population, while the largest religious group remained Jewish. Returning parishioners worked to restore the church's furnishings lost during the war years. For example, residents of Krupice funded a new Golgotha. By 1936, the parish had 5,914 members, including 589 from Siemiatycze itself, and from 24 surrounding villages.

=== After 1945 ===
After World War II, some Orthodox residents of Siemiatycze either voluntarily or forcibly relocated to the Belarusian SSR or the Recovered Territories. However, with the establishment of Siemiatycze County and the influx of new residents, the number of parishioners increased again, reaching 5,500 by the 1980s. In 1953, Metropolitan Macarius Oksiyuk of Warsaw and all Poland visited the parish.

In 1966, in preparation for the church's centennial, the building was reroofed with zinc plates and repainted. Local families, the Koszewniks and Kuźmiuks, donated new liturgical vessels, while members of the local church brotherhood funded the construction of the Tomb of the Mother of God. The tomb was carved by a folk artist from Klukowicze, with the burial shroud created in Białystok. The church also acquired new bells. On the centennial of the church's construction, Metropolitan Stefan Rudyk of Warsaw and all Poland led the Divine Liturgy.

On 1 May 1973, the church suffered significant damage due to a fire. Restoring the interior, including the icons, took several years. The Golgotha was completely destroyed and had to be replaced. The most severely damaged icons were restored in Warsaw by Maria Orthwein. After the repairs, the church was reconsecrated by Metropolitan Bazyli Doroszkiewicz of Warsaw and all Poland. In the following years, additional renovation and conservation work continued. The church's furnishings were enhanced thanks to donors. Crosses, the chandelier, and candle holders were coated in nickel, and two copper candle holders were purchased by the local church brotherhood. Wiera Nieroszczuk from Kleszczele painted icons of St. Elijah and Christ the Savior for the church, and created a new Golgotha.

By 1988, the parish of Saints Peter and Paul had an estimated 7,000 faithful.

=== After 1989 ===
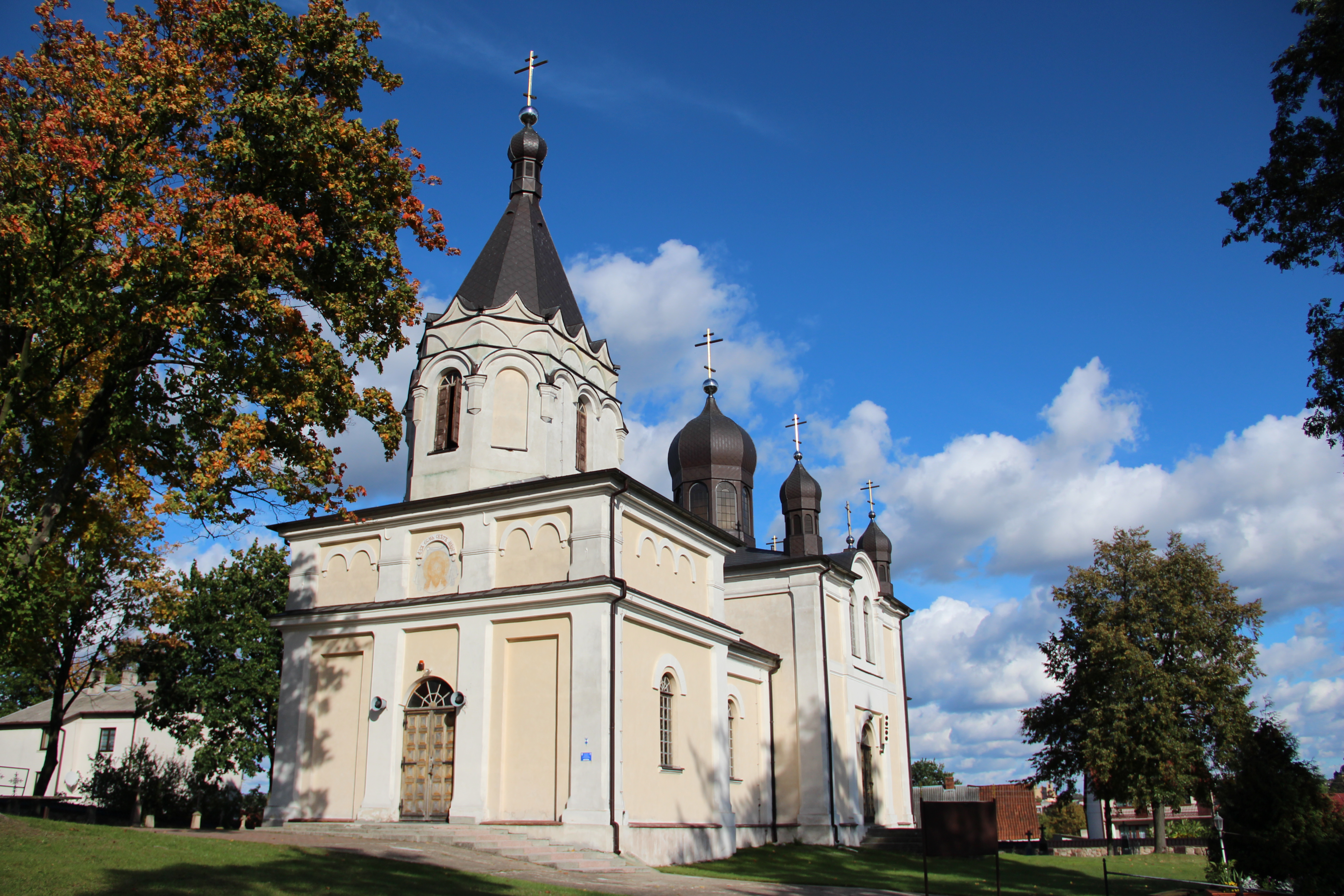
Western elevation

On 7 December 1995, the church, along with its cemetery, guardhouse, and fencing, was registered as a historic monument (number A-110). The following year, the number of parishioners at Saints Peter and Paul Parish significantly decreased as new parishes were established in Boratyniec Ruski and Rogawka, as well as a second parish in Siemiatycze, dedicated to the Resurrection of Christ.

During the 1990s, a comprehensive renovation of the church took place. New plaster was applied to both the exterior and interior, all windows and doors were replaced, and the electrical and alarm systems were updated. The wooden floor was replaced with concrete and terrazzo, under which a heating system was installed. The iconostasis and all icons within it were restored, with gilding applied to the royal doors, icon frames, and ornamental elements. The interior walls were adorned with polychromy created by Belarusian iconographers Aleksander Łoś and Wiktor Downar.

On 17 August 2000, a copy of the Panagia Portaitissa, donated by monks from Mount Athos to the Grabarka Holy Mount, was exhibited for veneration in the church.

In 2003, a thorough renovation of the roof was completed, replacing it with copper sheeting. All seven church domes were replaced, and nine new crosses were installed, consecrated by Archbishop Abel Popławski of Lublin and Chełm.

The church has hosted services led by Metropolitan Sawa of Warsaw and all Poland. It was also visited by Patriarch Peter of Alexandria and all Africa in 2001, as well as a delegation from the Greek Orthodox Church led by Metropolitan Eusebius of Samos and Ikaria in the same year. From 2006 to 2008, the stone fencing surrounding the church was completely replaced.

After Archimandrite Jerzy Pańkowski was appointed auxiliary bishop of the Diocese of Warsaw and Bielsk with the title of Bishop of Siemiatycze, the church of Saints Peter and Paul became his titular cathedral, although it did not officially receive the rank of a cathedral. Bishop Jerzy served for the first time in Siemiatycze on the Feast of the Presentation of Jesus (February 15) in 2007 and for the last time on 11 June 2017, after he was transferred to the Eparchy of Wrocław and Szczecin. The next Bishop of Siemiatycze, Warsonofiusz Doroszkiewicz, was consecrated in this church on 8 October 2017.

Since 2004, a Religious and Paraliturgical Song Review has been held annually in November at the church and, once completed, at the Resurrection of Christ Church. The event features church choirs and groups performing Belarusian, Ukrainian, and Russian folk music.

In 2021, the church received relics of its patrons – Saints Peter and Paul.

== Architecture ==
=== Building structure ===
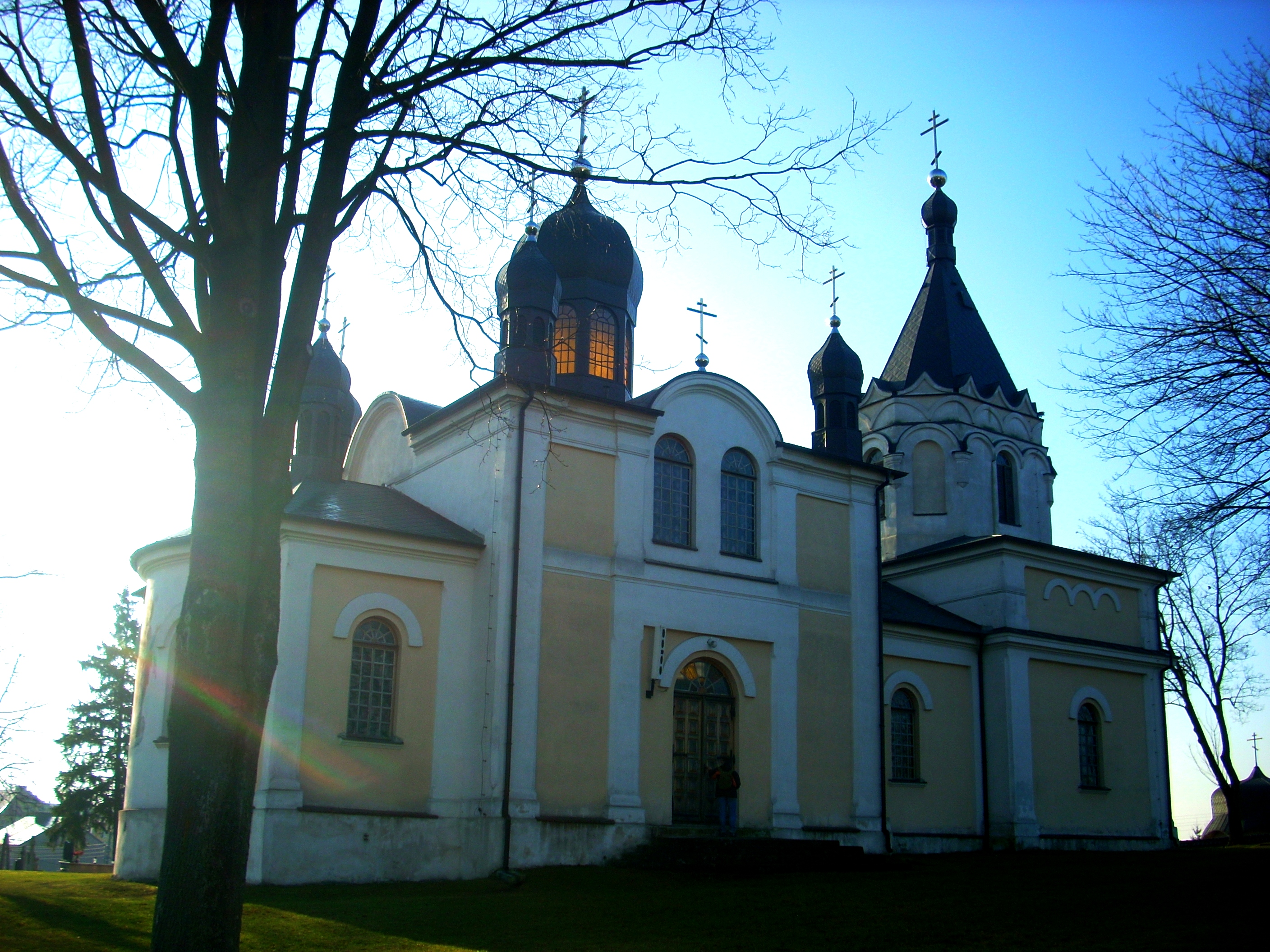
Church from the north

The Saints Peter and Paul Church in Siemiatycze was constructed following a design from Konstantin Thon's pattern book of church designs, in the Russian Revival style. It is a brick, oriented, three-part structure. The single nave is square, while the chancel and the church porch are built on a narrower rectangular plan. The nave is covered with a cross-shaped ceiling.

The church's façades are divided using lesenes. Above the church porch rises a single-story tower topped with a flattened tent roof, while the nave is covered by a gable roof. Semi-circular arches sit above the windows.

=== Interior ===
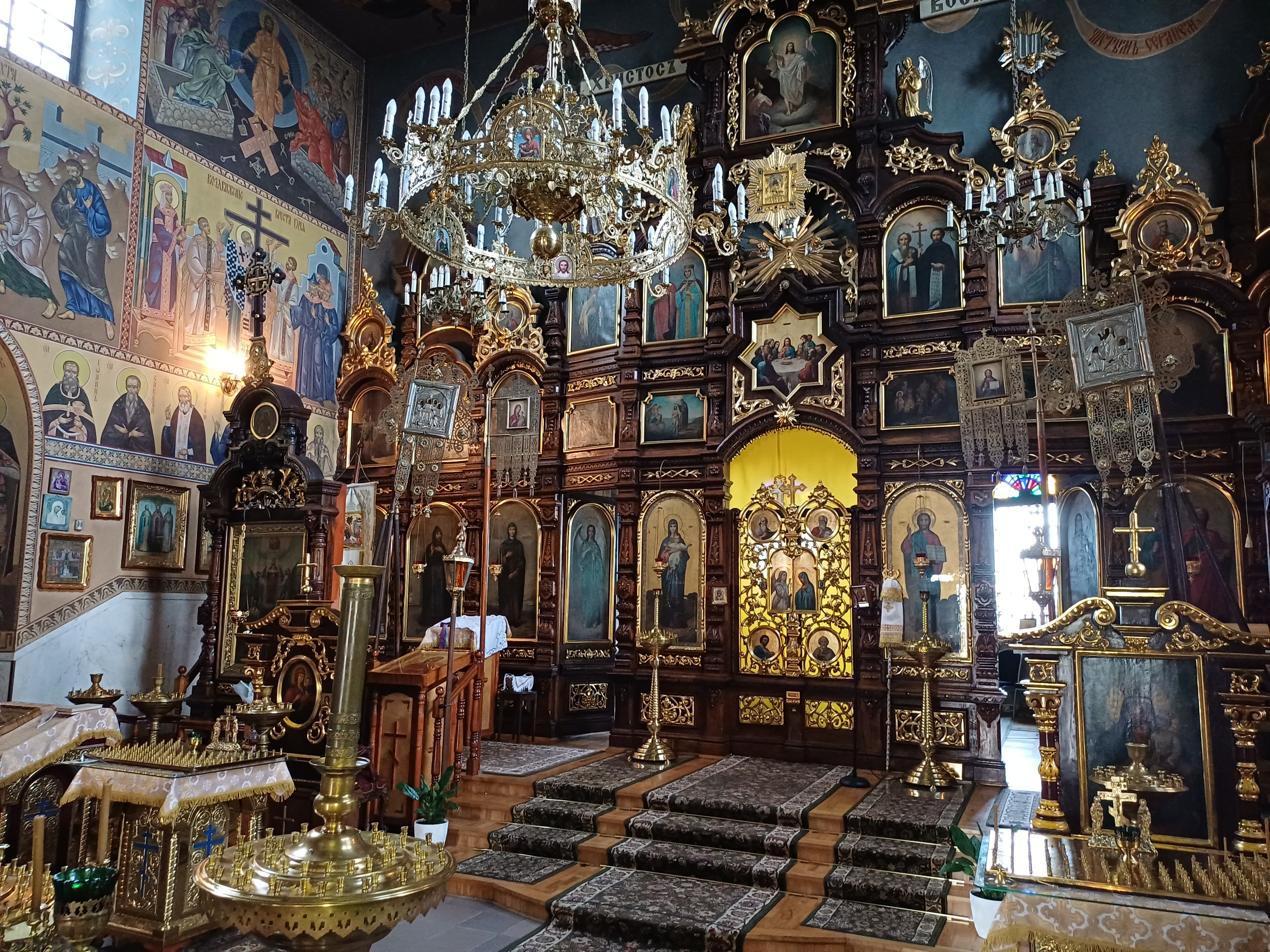
Iconostasis in the church

Inside the church, the icons of Saints Peter and Paul and Saint Paraskeva are especially venerated. These icons, according to historian Grzegorz Sosna, who cites a description by Bishop Joseph Sokolov, were created for the first, 15th-century church. However, art conservator Maria Orthwein, who restored both icons in the 1970s, considered them to be much younger. In the Katalog zabytków sztuki w Polsce (Catalogue of Art Monuments in Poland), these images are described as Baroque icons from the first half of the 17th century.

The church's iconostasis dates from 1908. Icons of Saint Anthony of Kiev and Saint Theodosius of Chernihiv, purchased by parish priest Dubiński, date from the early 20th century. The icons of Anthony, John, and Eustathius and Saint Seraphim of Sarov, made in Chernihiv, date from 1905. Older icons, including those of Saint Nicholas and the Mother of God, were placed in decorative icon cases at the beginning of the 20th century. A new seven-candle chandelier was installed in the church in 1907.

An icon of Saint Alexander Nevsky, originally housed in a chapel built in the center of the town to commemorate the Russian victory at the Battle of Siemiatycze, now resides in the church. The chapel was demolished in 1925.

The church also contains three processional banners from the early 20th century depicting the Mother of God and Christ the Savior, the Częstochowa Icon of the Mother of God, Saints Cyril and Methodius, the Kazan Icon of the Mother of God, and Saint Vladimir. The rectory houses a Uniate pax from 1793, originally part of the church’s furnishings. A 19th-century folk crucifix is located in the church porch.

The polychromy inside the building is modern, created during a comprehensive renovation in the late 1990s. The internal doors were crafted by Siemiatycze sculptor Wieczysław Szum in the second half of the 20th century.

== Bibliography ==
- Maroszek, Józef (1989). "Siemiatycze jako ośrodek dóbr ziemskich w XV–XVII w. (do 1801 r.)" [Siemiatycze as a center of landed estates in the 15th–17th centuries (until 1801)]. In Majecki, H. (ed.). Studia i materiały do dziejów Siemiatycz [Studies and materials on the history of Siemiatycze] (in Polish). Warsaw: Państwowe Wydawnictwo Naukowe. ISBN 83-01-07983-5.
- Sosna, Grzegorz (1989). "Rys historii parafii prawosławnej w Siemiatyczach" [Outline of the history of the Orthodox parish in Siemiatycze]. In Majecki, H. (ed.). Studia i materiały do dziejów Siemiatycz [Studies and materials on the history of Siemiatycze] (in Polish). Warsaw: Państwowe Wydawnictwo Naukowe. ISBN 83-01-07983-5.
- Sosna, Grzegorz; Troc-Sosna, A. (2006). Święte miejsca i cudowne ikony. Prawosławne sanktuaria na Białostocczyźnie [Holy places and miraculous icons. Orthodox sanctuaries in the Białystok region] (in Polish). Białystok: Orthdruk. ISBN 83-85368-69-8.
- Oleksicki, A. (1989). "Zabytki architektury Siemiatycz a przemiany w rozplanowaniu przestrzennym miasta w XVIII w." [Architectural monuments of Siemiatycze and changes in the spatial layout of the city in the 18th century]. In Majecki, H. (ed.). Studia i materiały do dziejów Siemiatycz [Studies and materials on the history of Siemiatycze] (in Polish). Warsaw: Państwowe Wydawnictwo Naukowe. ISBN 83-01-07983-5.
- "Historia parafii świętych apostołów Piotra i Pawła w Siemiatyczach" [History of the Parish of Saints Peter and Paul in Siemiatycze]. Kalendarz Prawosławny (in Polish). Warszawska Metropolia Prawosławna. 2012. ISSN 1425-2171.
- Dobroński, A. (1989). "Siemiatycze pod zaborem rosyjskim" [Siemiatycze under Russian occupation]. In Majecki, H. (ed.). Studia i materiały do dziejów Siemiatycz [Studies and materials on the history of Siemiatycze] (in Polish). Warsaw: Państwowe Wydawnictwo Naukowe. ISBN 83-01-07983-5.
