= 7.92×107mm DS =

Anti-tank rifle cartridge

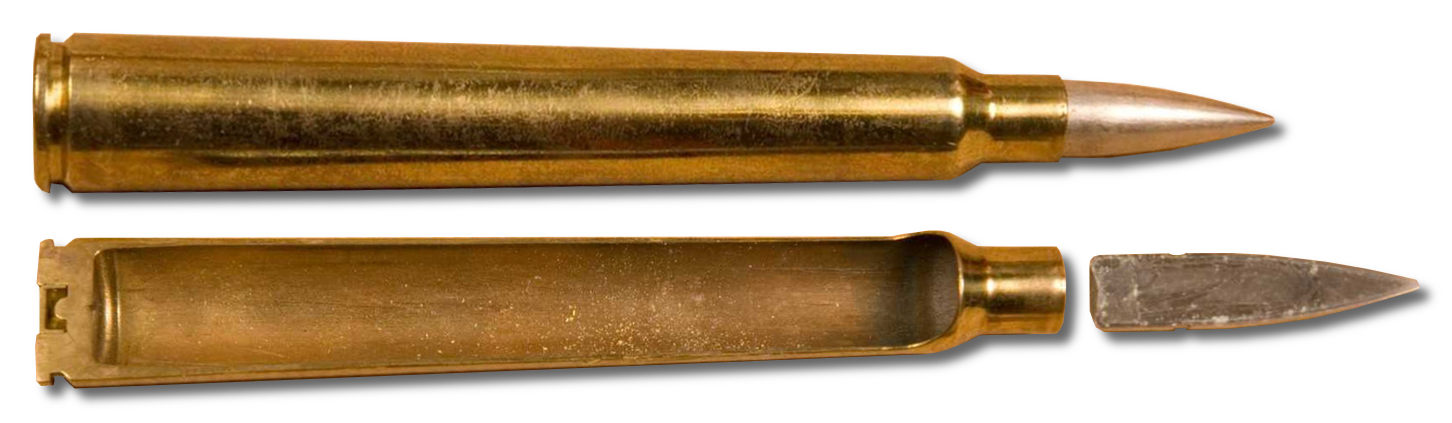
- Type: Anti-tank rifle
- Place of origin: Poland

Production history
- Designer: Lt. Colonel Tadeusz Felsztyn
- Designed: 1931

Specifications
- Parent case: 7.92×57mm Mauser
- Case type: Rimless, bottleneck
- Bullet diameter: 8.18 mm (0.322 in)
- Neck diameter: 9.23 mm (0.363 in)
- Shoulder diameter: 13.15 mm (0.518 in)
- Base diameter: 16.39 mm (0.645 in)
- Rim diameter: 16.36 mm (0.644 in)
- Case length: 107.18 mm (4.220 in)
- Overall length: 132 mm (5.2 in)

Ballistic performance
Bullet mass/type	Velocity	Energy
14.6 g (225 gr)	1,275 m/s (4,180 ft/s)	11,850 J (8,740 ft⋅lbf)

The 7.92×107mm DS was a Polish 7.92 mm anti-tank ammunition designed specifically for use with the karabin przeciwpancerny wz.35 anti-tank rifle. It was based on a standard 7.92×57mm Mauser cartridge, but was much longer (107 mm as opposed to the 57 mm of the Mauser cartridge) and was modified to provide higher muzzle velocity and hence greater penetrating power.

== History ==
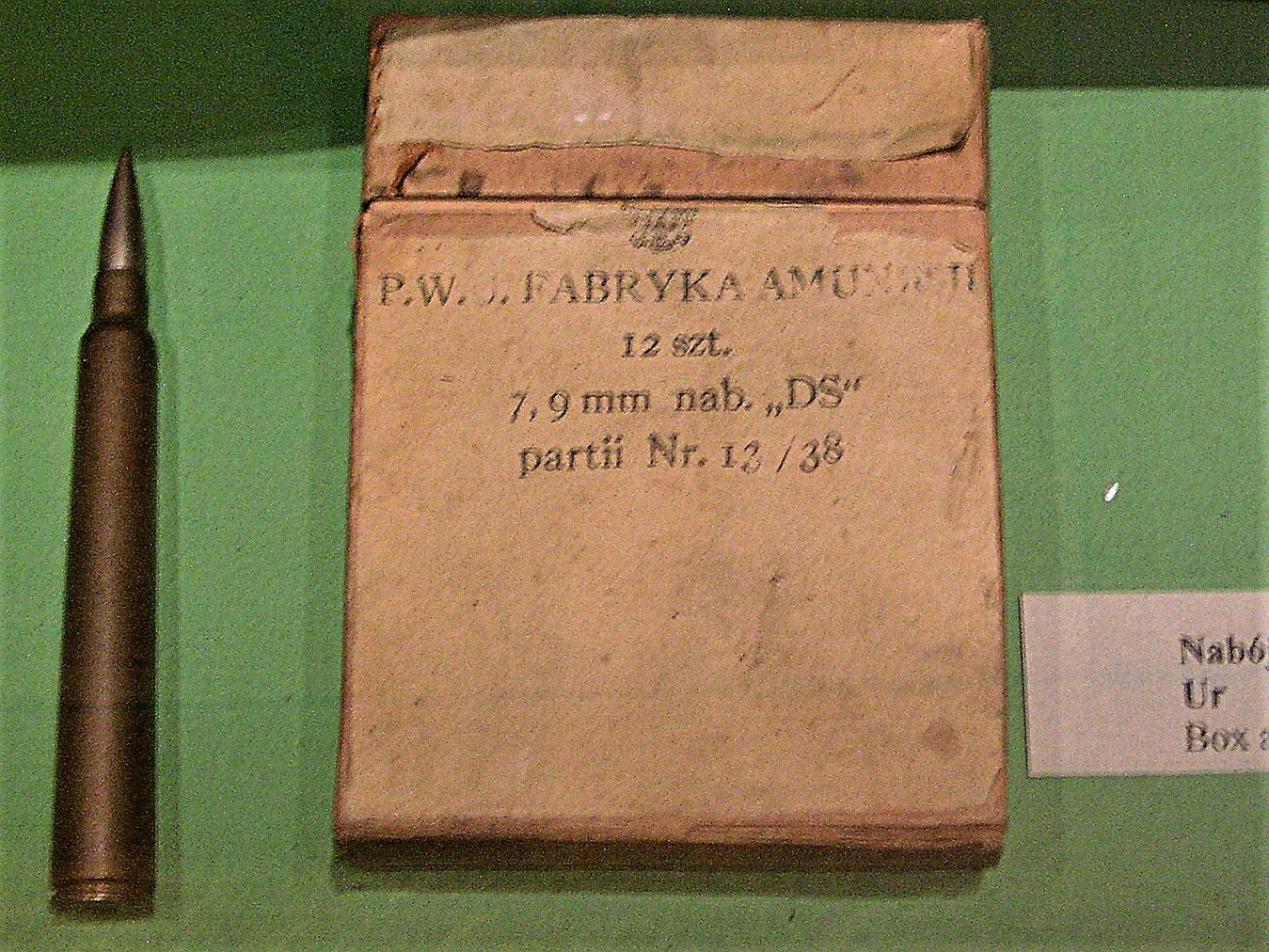
DS 7.92mm anti-tank rifle ammunition - a single cartridge and an entire box.

In the late 1920s, the Polish General Staff started the development of a light anti-tank weapon for the Polish infantry. In 1931, Lt. Colonel Tadeusz Felsztyn from the Institute of Armament Technology in Warsaw started the first tests of various low-calibre cartridges. After the tests of German-made Hagler bullets proved the possibilities of such ammunition in perforation of steel plates, the National Ammunition Factory in Skarżysko-Kamienna was ordered to develop its own 7.92 mm cartridge with a muzzle velocity of over 1,000 m/s (3,300 ft/s). After a series of tests, a new DS cartridge was proposed.

The DS ammunition was based on a standard 7.92 mm cartridge used by both the Mauser rifles and the Polish Karabinek wz. 29. The length of the cartridge was extended to 131.2 mm (5.17 in) and the overall weight reached 64.25 g (2.266 oz). After an additional series of tests, the initial copper coating was replaced with a coating made of brass (an alloy of 67% copper and 23% zinc).

== See also ==
- wz. 35 anti-tank rifle
- Table of handgun and rifle cartridges
