= ZH-29 =

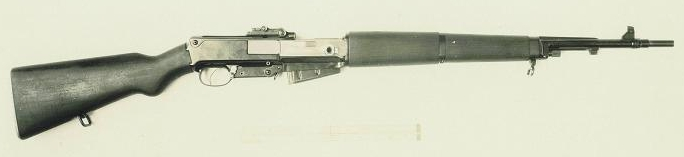
- ZH-29 semi-automatic rifle
- Type: Semi-automatic rifle
- Place of origin: Czechoslovakia

Service history
- Used by: See Users
- Wars: Second Sino-Japanese War; World War II

Production history
- Designer: Emanuel Holek
- Designed: 1929
- Manufacturer: Ceskoslovenska Zbrojovka
- Variants: ZH-32 Z-37 Type Otsu

Specifications
- Mass: 4.5 kg (9.9 lb)
- Length: 1,150 mm (45 in)
- Barrel length: 545 mm (21.5 in)
- Cartridge: 7.92×57mm Mauser
- Action: Gas-operated, tilting bolt
- Muzzle velocity: 808 m/s (2,650 ft/s)
- Effective firing range: 350 m (380 yd)
- Feed system: 5, 10, or 20-round box magazine
- Sights: iron sights

The ZH-29 was a semi-automatic rifle developed in Czechoslovakia during the late 1920s, and used by the Chinese National Revolutionary Army.

== Overview ==
The ZH-29 is a gas-operated semi-automatic service rifle with a tilting-bolt locking system similar to that which would be later used in the Sturmgewehr 44; although while the bolt of the German gun tilts vertically, that of the ZH-29 does so to the left side. Externally the most distinctive feature is that the barrel is offset at a slight angle to the receiver to compensate for this. Also unusually, the rifle uses an aluminium barrel jacket.

An upgraded variant was designated as the ZH-32.

In China, Zhang Zuolin's army received 150 ZH-29 and 100 ZH-32 rifles, and the provincial troops of Guangdong also received 33 ZH-32. A derivative prototype was made before 1932 at the Mukden (Shenyang) Arsenal. It is unlikely that these rifles saw action during the Sino-Japanese War.

A version of the ZH-29 rifle was chambered in .276 Pedersen cartridge and was submitted to US Army trials but was unsuccessful.

During the last stages of the development of the AK-47 assault rifle, the testing grounds committee advised Mikhail Kalashnikov to redesign the trigger group of the AK-46 rifle prototype along the lines of the ZH-29 rifle, which he did. The testing grounds committee also advised every competitor on how to generally improve their firearm designs.

== Users ==
- China: 210 imported in 1930-31
- Ethiopia: 100 ZH-32s
- Italy: Presumably captured from Ethiopia
- Japan: (Experimental prototype copy developed from captured examples from China)
- Lithuania
- Thailand

== See also ==
- Weapons of Czechoslovakia interwar period
- Kbsp wz. 1938M
