= Wz. 35 anti-tank rifle =

Polish anti-tank rifle

Karabin przeciwpancerny wz. 35
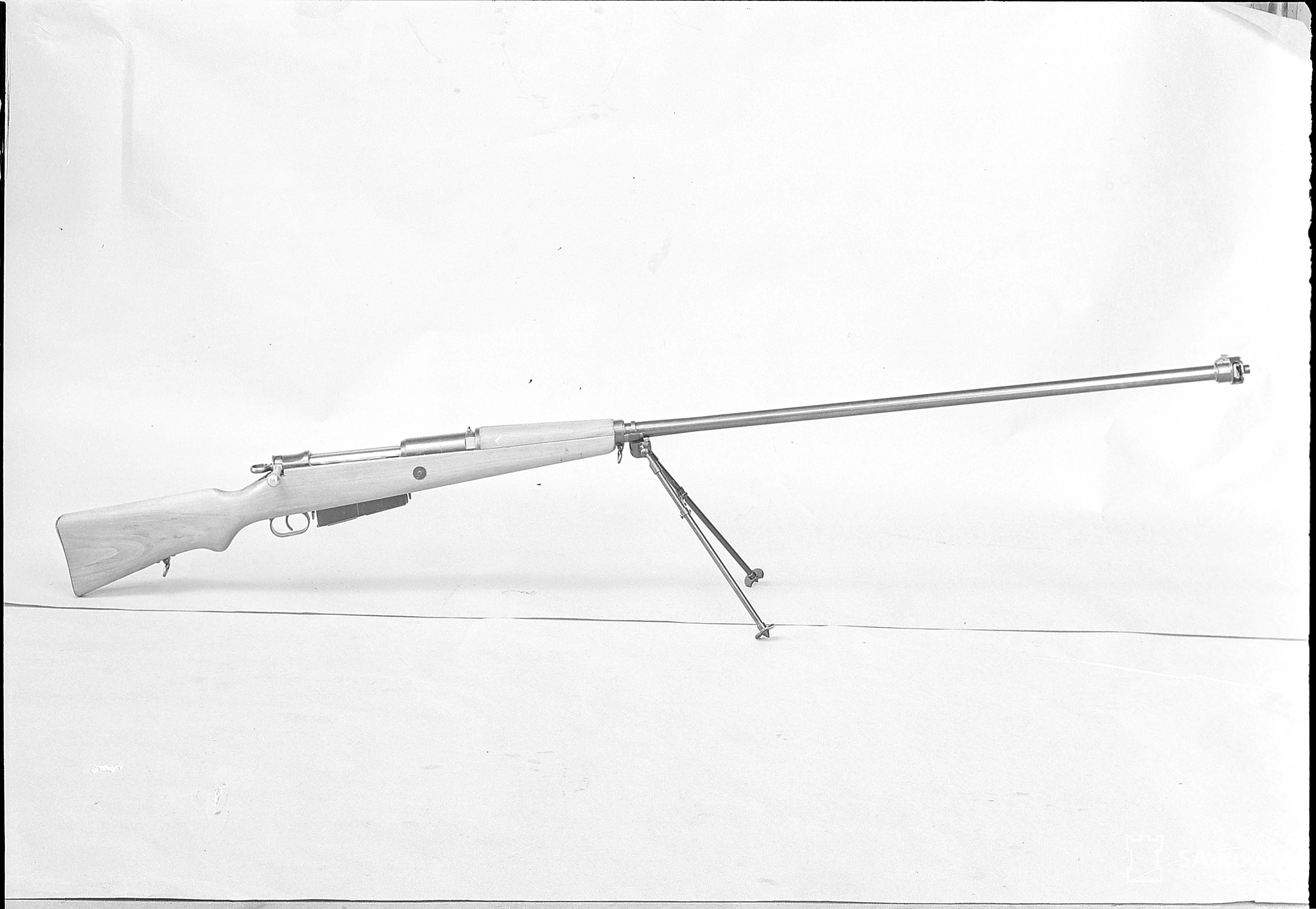
- Photo of a wz. 35 in Finnish service in 1942 under designation 8 mm pst kiv/38.
- Type: Anti-tank rifle
- Place of origin: Poland

Service history
- In service: 1939 (Polish military service); 1939–1945 (See Users)
- Used by: Poland see Users
- Wars: World War II: Polish Campaign; North African Campaign; Operation Barbarossa

Production history
- Designer: Józef Maroszek
- Designed: 1935
- Manufacturer: Państwowa Fabryka Karabinów
- Produced: 1938–1939
- No. built: est. 6,500
- Variants: None. Various redesignations under different armies: Germany: PzB 35(p) / PzB 770(p) / PzB 770(i); Italy: Fucile Controcarro 35(P); Finland: 8 mm pst kiv/38

Specifications
- Mass: 10 kg (22 lb) (loaded); 9.5 kg (21 lb) (unloaded); 9.0 kg (19.8 lb) (unloaded and without bipod)
- Length: 1,760 mm (69 in)
- Barrel length: 1,200 mm (47 in)
- Cartridge: 7.92×107mm DS
- Caliber: 7.9mm
- Action: Bolt action
- Rate of fire: 8–10 round/min
- Muzzle velocity: 1,275 m/s (4,180 ft/s)
- Effective firing range: 100 m (110 yd); 33 mm of armor penetration
- Maximum firing range: 300 m (330 yd); 15 mm of armor penetration
- Feed system: 4-round box magazine
- Sights: Open Sights

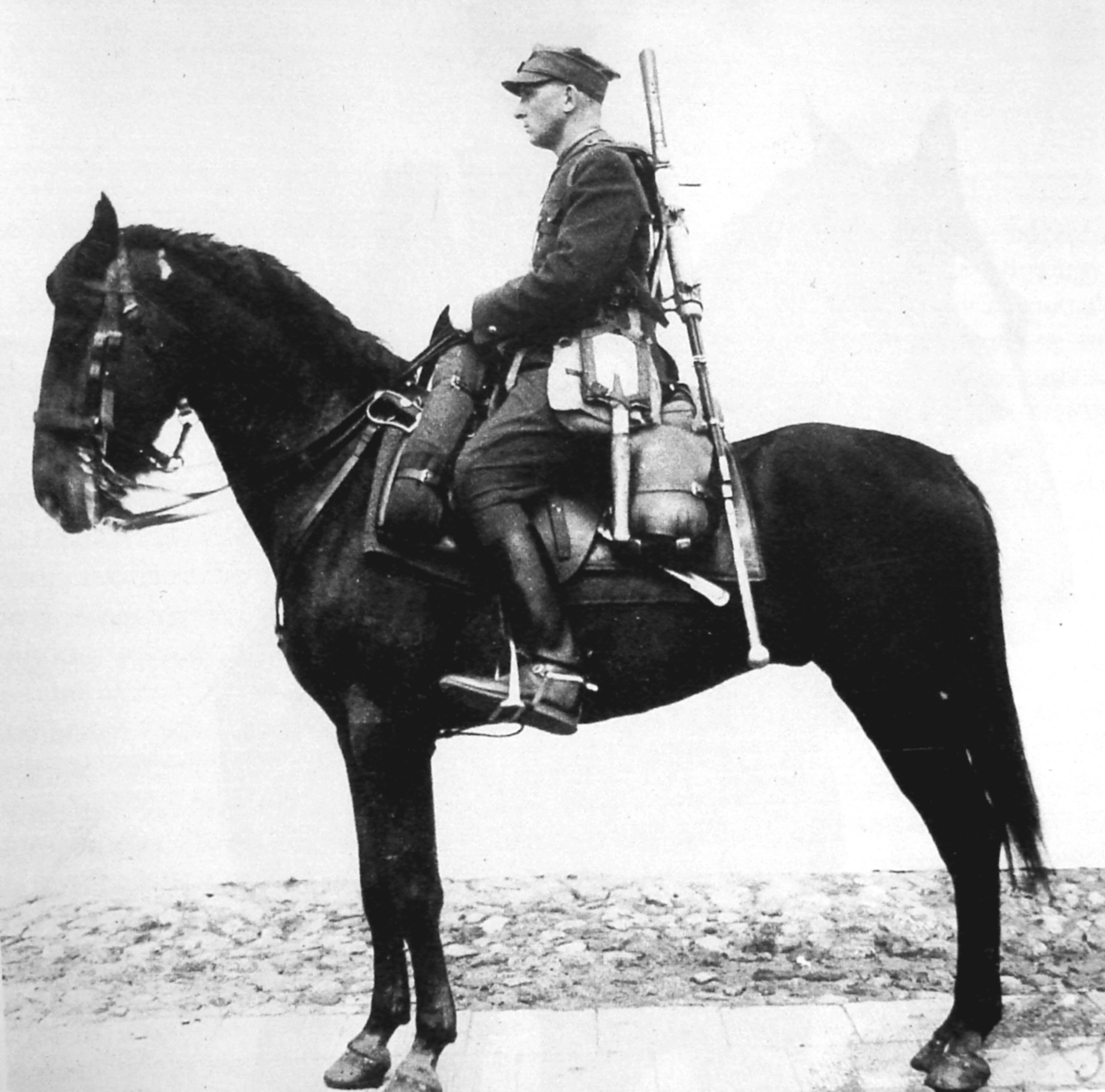
Polish uhlan with wz. 35 anti-tank rifle. Military instruction published in Warsaw in 1938.

The karabin przeciwpancerny wz. 35 (abbreviated kb ppanc wz. 35) is a Polish 7.92 mm anti-tank rifle that was used by the Polish Armed Forces during the 1939 Polish Campaign of World War II and later by several Axis armies.

It was designated wzór 35 for its design year, 1935. It was also known by its codename "Uruguay", after the country (kb Urugwaj or kb Ur) and by the name of its designer, Józef Maroszek. The weapon was a top secret project of the Polish Army, and neither German nor Soviet intelligence was aware of it. It was a bolt-action rifle, fed from a 4-round box magazine.

== Secrecy ==
The weapon was a top secret project of the Polish Army, and was also known by various codenames. Until mobilization in 1939, the combat-ready rifles were held in sealed crates marked: "Do not open! Surveillance equipment A.R." or "Optical equipment". Another of the rifle's cover names was "Uruguay" (Polish: Urugwaj) or Ur in short, the country to which the "surveillance equipment" was supposedly being exported. This name however was never used by soldiers in field, and was popularized in postwar publications. The secrecy was efficient and neither German nor Soviet intelligence was aware of a relatively numerous anti-tank rifle. It was widely believed in postwar literature, that the utmost secrecy prevented most of rifles from being used. Newer research however proves, that majority of rifles distributed to units were used in combat. On 15 July 1939, an order was issued to present the rifle to selected groups of sworn marksmen from all infantry and cavalry units, with a short training. There are estimates, that some 2,100 marksmen should have been trained then. The rifle itself was simple to operate and not much different from a standard issue Mauser rifle, and there was a manual in each crate.

After the fall of Poland, the German army captured large numbers of the kb ppanc wz. 35 and gave it the designation "Panzerbüchse 35 (polnisch)" (abbreviated "PzB 35(p)"). The Italian army later received 800 of the captured weapons, designating them "fucile controcarro 35(P)". Both names translate roughly as "anti-tank rifle model 1935 (Polish)".

In early 1940, one of the rifles, its stock and barrel sawed off, was smuggled out of Poland across the Tatra Mountains into Hungary for the Allies by Krystyna Skarbek and fellow Polish couriers. The rifle never saw service with the Allies, however. The drawings and specifications had been destroyed by the Poles when it became clear that defeat was inevitable.

== Description ==
It resembled a rifle with a longer-than-normal barrel supported by a bipod at the front of the wooden stock. It was a Mauser style, bolt-action rifle, fed from a 4-round box magazine. The barrel had a muzzle brake to limit recoil. It absorbed about 65% of the shot energy, and the recoil was comparable to a standard Mauser rifle, even though the cartridge carried more than twice the amount of propellant. It had iron sights fixed for a 300-meter range.

Unlike contemporary anti-tank rifles, it lacked a pistol grip and fired a bullet with a lead core rather than an armour-piercing round with a hard core. The full metal jacket bullet weighed 14.579 g and, due to a high muzzle velocity, was effective even under shallow angles, as instead of ricocheting, the bullet would "stick" to the armour and punch a roughly 20 mm diameter hole. Calculated kinetic energy, by shot, before brake was about 11,850 J. The high energy was due to the relatively long barrel, and nitro powder giving a muzzle velocity of 1,275 m/s.

== History ==
=== Background ===
In the late 1920s the Polish General Staff was looking for a light antitank weapon for Polish infantry. In 1931 Dr. Tadeusz Felsztyn, a major at the Central Rifle School in Toruń, came up with the idea of a high-velocity, low-caliber antitank cartridge, inspired by reports of new German Halger hunting cartridges designed by Hermann Gerlich. Tests of a purchased Halger 7.1 mm rifle in October 1931 showed the idea to be promising.

The General Staff's Armament Department ordered work to start immediately at the State Armament Factories (Państwowa Wytwórnia Uzbrojenia) in Warsaw and a state powder factory at Pionki. Initially it was envisaged that a final caliber would be 10-13 mm with a muzzle velocity of over 1,000 meters per second. An experimental 1932 design by Captain Edward Kapkowski, firing 7.92×92 cartridges from a Mauser rifle barrel, was unsuccessful but showed that a rifle caliber was enough to perforate armor plate. Further team work was coordinated by Lt. Col. Tadeusz Felsztyn, working at the Armament Research Institute in Warsaw. After a series of tests, a new 7.92×107 DS cartridge was proposed.

=== Ammunition ===
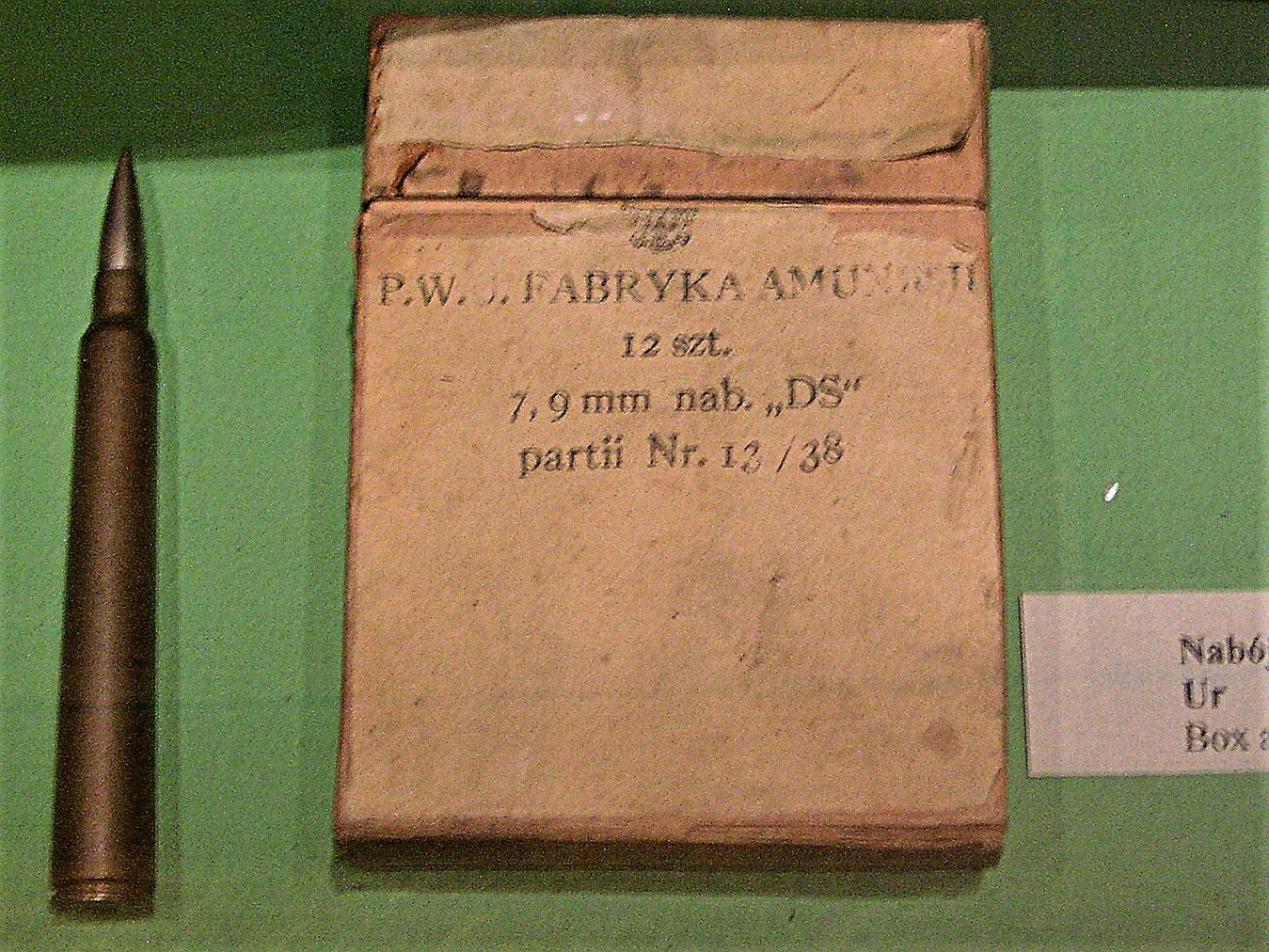
7.92mm DS antitank cartridge (left). Box (right) held 12 cartridges.

The DS ammunition was originated from the standard 7.92×57mm cartridge as used by both the Mauser rifle 1898 (wz. 98) and its Polish variant the karabinek wz. 29. The length of the cartridge was extended to 131.2 millimetres (5.17 in) and the overall weight was 64.25 grams (2.266 oz). After an additional series of tests the copper cartridge case was replaced with a case made of brass (67% copper/ 23% zinc).

The round's armor-defeating properties were not through penetration, i.e. by punching the core through the armor like a typical penetrator, but through the impact of the bullet flattening against the plate, transferring kinetic energy to the metal. The result was that the bullet would cause spalling on the interior of the armor plate, ideally ejecting an approximately 20 mm-diameter fragment from the interior surface of the armour at high speed, which would then ricochet around the interior, hopefully killing crew and/or damaging equipment or engines (this is similar in concept to modern HESH anti-tank rounds, albeit less potent). Due to the physics of spalling, the size of this spall was larger than the actual rifle caliber, and could theoretically do more damage ricocheting around inside the vehicle than the bullet itself would if it penetrated. The downside was that since the bullet itself was not designed to penetrate, it could not be filled with an incendiary component and used to ignite fuel tanks, or filled with tear gas (as used by the similar German 7.92×94mm anti-tank rifle cartridge), which was intended to force the crew to evacuate, or at least greatly reduce their combat effectiveness, even if no-one was hit by the bullet itself.

The wz. 35 is inspired by the 13.2mm TuF anti-tank rifle, also a scaled-up G98 rifle. The main difference is that while the TuF were chambered in a large-caliber round, the wz. 35 used an oversized cartridge case mated to a rifle-caliber 8mm bullet, giving very high velocity at the expense of hitting power and energy retention over distance. The Panzerbüchse 39 also used an 8mm bullet, but with an out-sized 8mm Mauser cartridge case known as the 7.92×94mm Patrone 318, and a special tool-steel cored bullet.

=== Rifle ===
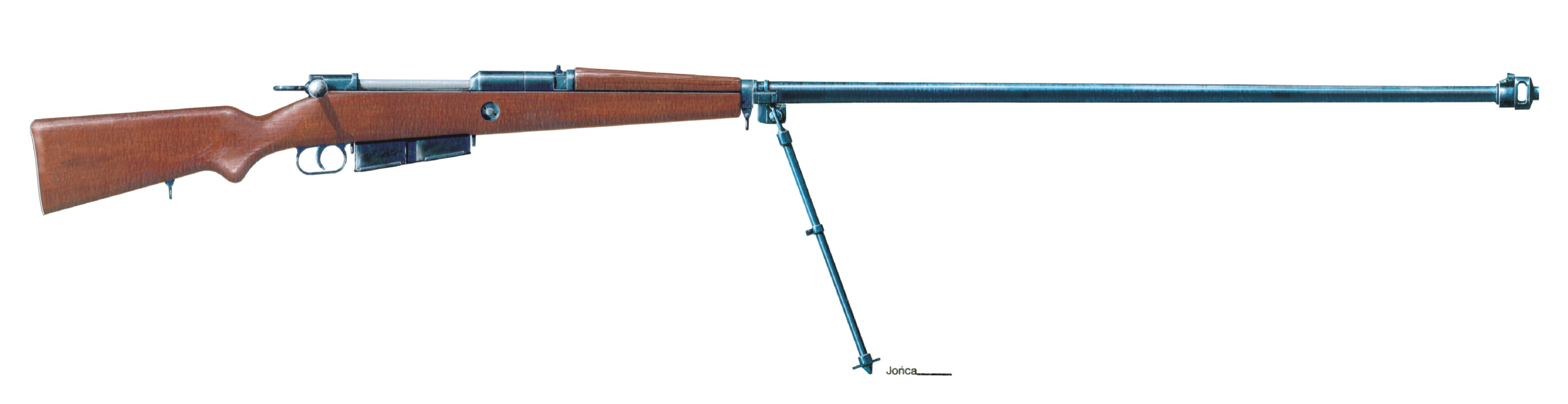
Wz. 35 anti-tank rifle

Simultaneous to the development of the ammunition, a young graduate of the Warsaw University of Technology, Józef Maroszek, was ordered to design an anti-tank rifle. On August 1, 1935, the Committee of Equipment and Armament officially ordered the rifle and in October the first tests of the new weapon commenced.

The rifle was based on his thesis project Karabinek KP-32, which was a reworked and simplified Mauser Gewehr 98, with the action scaled-up to sustain the higher pressure and length of the new cartridge, as well as the barrel lengthened significantly. The first tests carried out in Brześć and Pionki showed that the new weapon was capable of penetrating a 15 mm steel plate at a distance of 300 metres with similar results against angled steel plate. Initially the barrel could withstand only about 30 shots, after which it had to be replaced with a new one. However, this drawback was soon corrected and the final prototype could fire approximately 300 shots. The committee accepted the new design on November 25, 1935, and in December the Ministry of Military Affairs ordered the delivery of 5 rifles, 5000 cartridges and a set of spare barrels for further tests.

After the tests carried out by the Centre of Infantry Training in Rembertów proved the effectiveness and reliability of kb ppanc wz. 35, the Ministry ordered 7610 rifles to be delivered to the Polish Army by the end of 1939. It is uncertain how many rifles were actually produced, but it is estimated that there were more than 6,500 delivered by September 1939.

=== Use ===
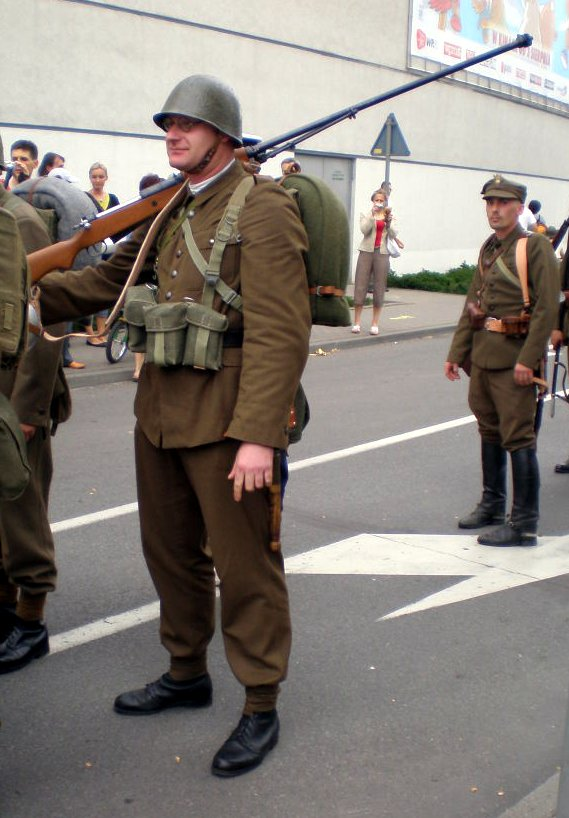
2007 military reenactment in Gdynia. Polish soldier with anti tank rifle.

The rifle was the main anti-tank weapon of an infantry platoon. Each infantry company and cavalry squadron was to be equipped with three rifles, each operated by a team of two soldiers. Additional anti-tank teams were to be created at a later stage. Although the weapon was successively introduced to the units, it remained a top secret. The rifles were kept in closed wooden crates, each marked with a number and a notice "Do not open; surveillance equipment". The teams were trained in secret military facilities just before the war, beginning in July 1939, and had to swear to preserve the secret (an approach similar to the German Wunderwaffe concept). During a mobilization, starting from 28 August 1939 it was ordered to issue rifles to units, and to train additional soldiers, still in secret.

The rifle was carried by the leader of the two-man rifle team on a carrying strap. The other member of the squad was his aide and provided him with cover while he was reloading. The weapon was usually fired from prone supported position with the bipod attached to the barrel. However, it could be also used in other positions, like prone unsupported and crouch. The effective range was 300 metres and the weapon was effective against any German tank of the period, including Panzer III and Panzer IV. It could penetrate all lightly armored vehicles at any range. It could penetrate 15 mm of armor, sloped at 30° at 300 m distance, or 33 mm of armor at 100 m.

==== Panzerbüchse 35(p) ====
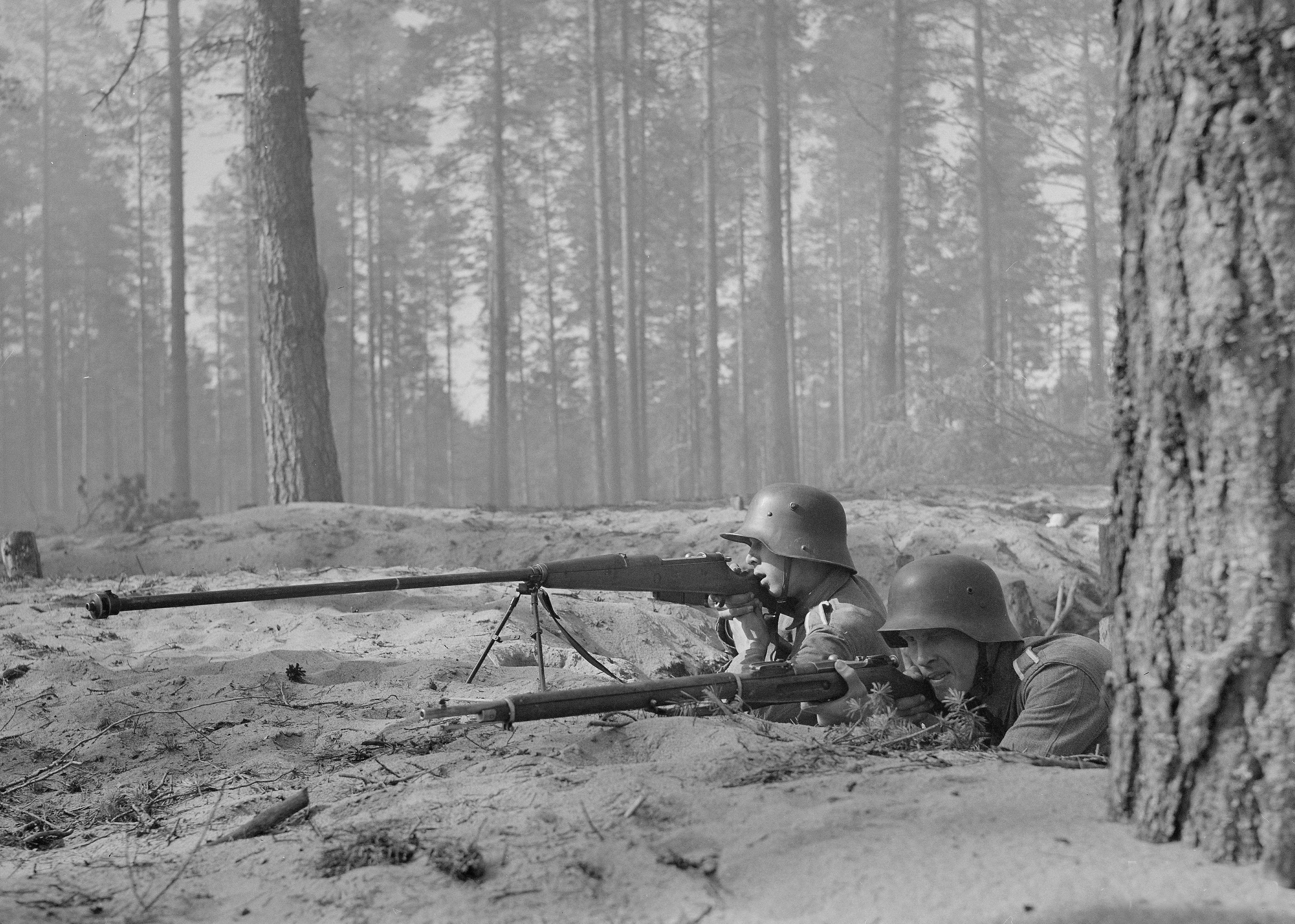
Finnish soldiers with wz. 35 in 1942.

The karabin przeciwpancerny wz. 35 was extensively used during the Polish Campaign by most Polish units. After Poland was overrun by Germany and the Soviet Union, large numbers of the weapon were captured. By 1940, Germany had pressed 800 into service as Panzerbüchse 35 (polnisch) (PzB 35(p)) and later PzB 770(p), and sped up work on their own simplified, one-shot anti-tank rifle Panzerbüchse 39 (PzB 39). Germany replaced some of the captured Polish DS ammunition with their own 7.92 mm hardened-steel-core bullets.

Hungary confiscated some of these rifles from Polish forces withdrawn into the Magyar land. Finland bought 30 of them in March 1940 but they arrived after the end of the Winter War. They performed poorly during the Continuation War and were used for training.

In 1941, Germany transferred PzB 35(p) to the Italian armed forces, which used them in combat under the designation Fucile Controcarro 35(P) until the end of World War II. The German Army recaptured some of these rifles after the Italian armistice and designated them as PzB 770(i).

== Users ==
- Poland – Standard anti-tank rifle of the late 1930s.
  - (Polish Underground State) Home Army and Polish resistance – At least 25 copies of wz. 35 AT rifles recovered by the Home Army after being buried in anticipation of Polish capitulation. Only a few of these were likely operational after recovery due to inadequate preservation.
- Nazi Germany – Captured, as PzB 35(p) and then later renamed PzB 770(p). Some copies were acquired from Italy after the Armistice of Cassibile and designated PzB 770(i).
- Italy – Approximately 800 copies purchased from Germany in 1941, as fucile controcarro 35(P).
- Finland – Used under designation 8 mm pst kiv/38.
- (Kingdom of Hungary (1920–1946)) Kingdom of Hungary – Unknown number confiscated from retreating Polish forces into Hungary. Probably not operational; at least 30 sold to Finland.
- Romania
- Soviet Union – Captured during the Soviet invasion of Eastern Poland in 1939, it is unlikely they ever saw action in Soviet service, but they were used in the development of the Degtyaryov-made PTRD-41.

== Survivors ==
There are at least three in the United Kingdom. One is on exhibit in Poland, at Warsaw's Polish Army Museum; another is located in Armament Museum in Poznań Citadel, another is in Museum of the Second World War in Gdańsk, and one is in Australian War Memorial in Canberra. The Norwegian Armed Forces Museum holds several specimens of the wz. 35.

== See also ==
- Anti-tank rifle
- Boys anti-tank rifle, a British anti-tank rifle
- Lahti L-39, a Finnish anti-tank rifle of higher caliber developed around the same time
- Mauser 1918 T-Gewehr, an older German predecessor
- Panzerbüchse 38 and 39, a very similar German anti-tank rifle
- PTRD-41 ― Soviet mass produced competing design to the PTRS
- PTRS-41 ― Soviet mass produced competing design to the PTRD
- Solothurn S-18/100, a German-Swiss high caliber anti-tank rifle
- Type 97 automatic cannon, an earlier developed Japanese anti-tank rifle
- Rukavishnikov M1939 anti-tank rifle, an early Soviet anti-tank rifle developed around the same period. Saw limited service and was quickly replaced by newer developed anti-tank rifles.
- Andrzej Kowerski, Polish officer and SOE agent who helped smuggle a wz. 35 AT rifle from Poland to Krystyna Skarbek's Hungarian apartment in Budapest. Did not see usage by the Allies due to lack of design and specification documents (which had been intentionally destroyed at the outbreak of war) as well as lack of time to reverse engineer.
- Saboted light armor penetrator, a possible descendant
