= Józef Maroszek =

Polish historian (1950–2024)

- Born: 18 October 1950; Białystok, Poland
- Died: 20 August 2024 (aged 73)
- Education: University in Warsaw
- Scientific career
- Workplaces: University in Białystok

Józef Maroszek (18 October 1950 – 20 August 2024) was a Polish historian.

== Memoir ==
Maroszek was the nephew of Józef Maroszek - a weapon designer and a long-time lecturer in the Warsaw University of Technology.

In 1974, he finished historical studies in University of Warsaw, in 1981 he became a doctor there. In 2000 he received a postdoctoral degree in Nicolaus Copernicus University in Toruń. Since 2002 he was a professor in University of Białystok, where he worked in Institute of History and Politics. He was the creator of Białystok History School.

In 2015, he was awarded for "saving Polish cultural heritage".

His scientific interests evolved from economic and social history to researches of history of colonization and economic and cultural transformations in Podlasie. Multiple works of Józef Maroszko focus on issues of history of former borderland of Kingdom of Poland and Grand Duchy of Lithuania from the early medieval period to twentieth century

In 2020, he received the works titled Historia, tradycja, pamięć (History, tradition, memory) (in redaction of Ewa Rogalewska, works of Białystok scientific society, ISSN 0067-6470; no. 54) with a dedication To professor Józef Maroszko in seventieth birthday.

Maroszek died on 20 August 2024, at the age of 73.

== Selected publications ==
- Craft in cities of Podlasie in XVI-XVIII century, Warsaw 1976
- Directory of antique parks and gardens in Białystok voivodeship, tomes I-XII, Białystok 1988
- Rural markets in Kingdom of Poland in XVII and XVIII century, Białystok 1990
- Rights and charters of city and earthly goods Zabłudów, Białystok 1994
- Monasteries of Podlasie – sources of culture and national appreciation, Białystok 1995
- Heritage of ecclesiastical union in the cultural landscape of Podlasie, Białystok 1996
- The book of decanal visit of Podlasie deanery, Białystok 1996
- Acts or cases of Knyszyn 1553-1580 (introduction and study - J. Maroszek), Białystok 1999
- The borderland of Poland and Lithuania in plans of king Zygmunt August – from history of realization of monarchical thought between Niemen and Narew, Białystok 1999
