= Państwowa Fabryka Karabinów =

Defunct Polish arms manufacturer

- Industry: arms, machinery
- Predecessor: Towarzystwa Akcyjne Fabryki Maszyn Gerlach i Pulst
- Founded: 1897
- Defunct: 2008
- Successor: VIS
- Headquarters: Warsaw

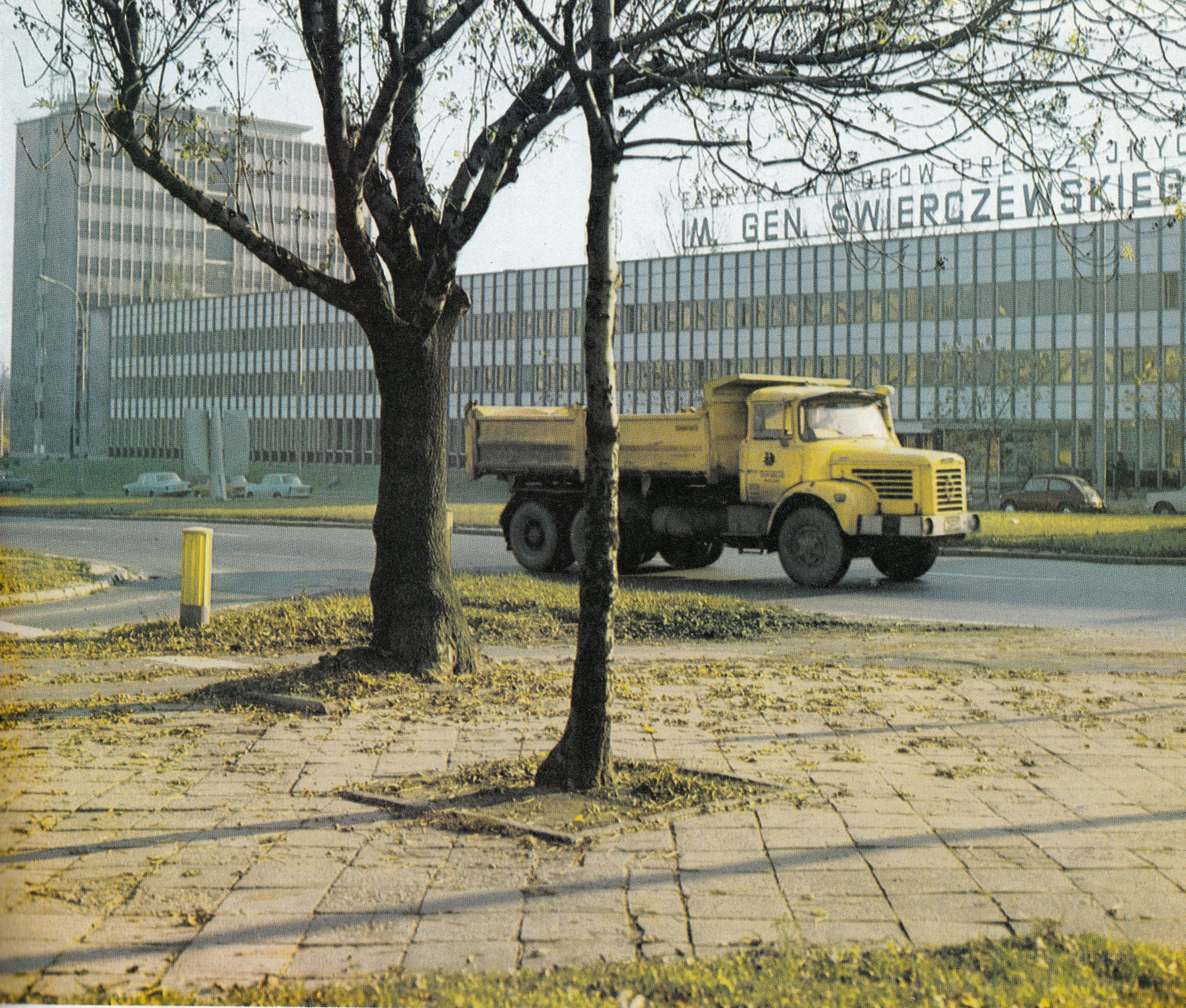
Museum of Państwowe Wytwórnie Uzbrojenia

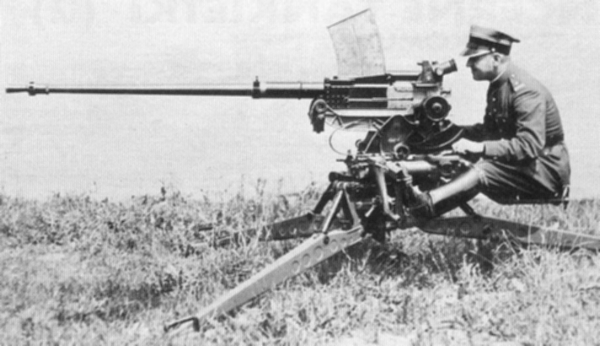
Nkm wz.38 FK, the most advanced Polish autocannon (dubbed "Heaviest Machine Gun") produced by Fabryka Karabinów

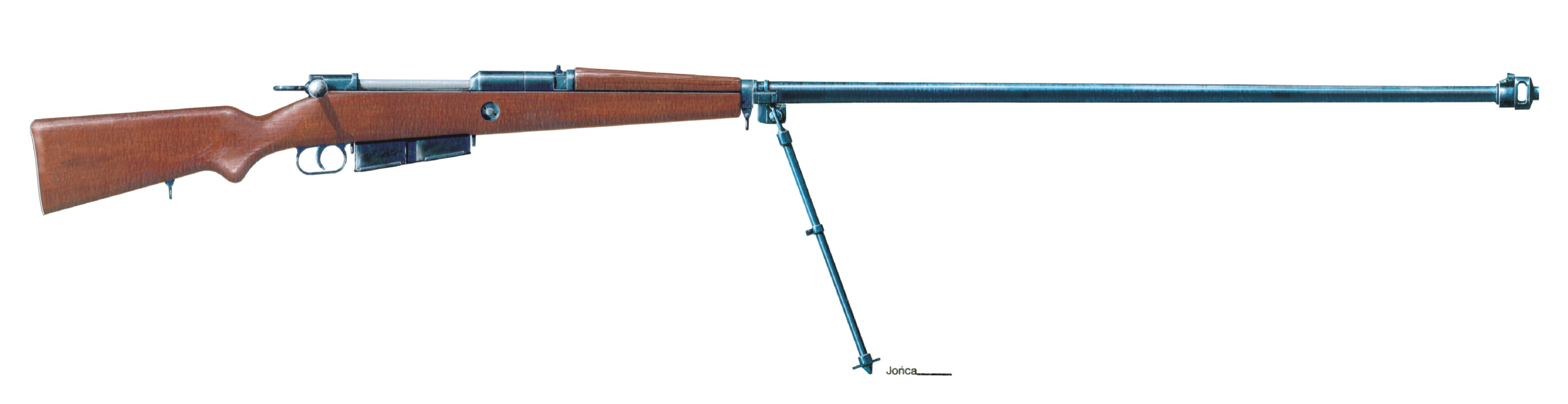
Although based on a standard infantry rifle, the wz. 35 anti-tank rifle was able to penetrate the armor of most German tanks in 1939

Państwowa Fabryka Karabinów (English: State Rifle Factory, often abbreviated FK) was a Polish arms manufacturer active between the two World Wars. Founded in 1919 as the successor to the pre-World War I Gerlach i Pulst company, Fabryka Karabinów became part of the state-owned Państwowe Wytwórnie Uzbrojenia conglomerate in 1927. It was a sister company to Łucznik Arms Factory, the Munitions Factory of Skarżysko, and several others. By the end of the 1930s, Fabryka Karabinów was one of the largest arms producers of Poland. It was destroyed during World War II. Nationalized after the war and with a new focus on civilian precision tools, it was renamed as VIS after 1989, but liquidated in the early 21st century.

== History ==
The company was started in the mid-19th century by Wilhelm Gerlach, one of the heirs of the Gerlach family of entrepreneurs, owners of – among others – the largest cutlery factory in Poland. By 1886 the small workshop at Srebrna Street in Warsaw was inherited by Wilhelm's son, Maksymilian Gerlach. In 1897 the factory was turned into a joint company owned by Gerlach and a new associate, Edward Pulst, who became the factory's chief engineer and technical director. In the following year, the factory was renamed to Spółka Akcyjna Fabryki Maszyn "Gerlach i Pulst" – "Gerlach and Pulst" Joint Stock Machinery Factory. In 1900 the company was moved to new premises at Dworska 2 Street in Warsaw. The "Gerlach i Pulst" produced machine tools, turneries, planers, drilling machines, presses, saws and many other types of machinery, used notably in small arms production. By the start of World War I the company had 750 employees and owned a "Gerlach & Co." machinery shop at Krucza 24 Street in down-town Warsaw. Following the start of the Great War, in 1915 most of company's assets were dismantled by the retreating Russians and sent by rail to other parts of Russia.

After the Great Retreat, the factory was taken over by the German Army who set up an arms repair workshop there. When Poland regained independence in 1919 the workshops were nationalised by the Ministry of Military Affairs along with all the remaining assets of the former Gerlach i Pulst company. Already in early 1919 the small-arms repair workshops were operational again. Reinforced with machines acquired from the former German Royal Arms Factory of Danzig and spare parts purchased in Germany, the workshops initially provided repair services to the Polish Army's units equipped with Mauser rifles. However, already in 1920 they were renamed to "State Rifle Factory" and in 1922 the company started producing rifles as well. By 1923 mass production started and by the end of the following year the factory delivered 21,900 kb wz. 98 rifles to the Polish Army. In the following year, a modified version, the kbk wz. 29, entered production. Production lasted until 1931 and amounted to 189,600 pieces. Since 1928, the company was the sole producer of rkm wz. 28 light machine gun. In 1930 it also started licensed production of ckm wz. 30 heavy machine guns. After that the production of rifles was moved to Radom-based Fabryka Broni, while the FK focused on more complicated designs.

By the end of the 1930s the Fabryka Karabinów was one of the largest arms producers of Poland, with production capabilities far exceeding potential orders from the army. For example, in 1938 the company's CEO estimated that the factory could produce 600 pieces of rkm wz. 28 LMG each month, while the total orders for that year amounted to only 900 pieces. By the outbreak of World War II the company produced 10,700 LMGs and 7861 HMGs, as well as a small batch of 30,000 Nagant M1895 revolvers for the Kingdom of Yugoslavia.

The company also designed and produced numerous aerial weapons. The first was the karabin maszynowy wz. 33, a 7.92×57mm Mauser calibre aerial version of the ckm wz. 30 multi-purpose HMG. It was further modified as the karabin lotniczy wz. 36. Another successful design was the karabin lotniczy wz. 37, based on the rkm wz. 28. One of the most advanced designs produced at FK was the nkm wz. 38 FK auto-cannon. Other modern designs included an experimental pre-production series of around 50 pistolet maszynowy wz. 39 Mors sub-machine guns and the highly-successful kb p-panc wz. 35 anti-tank rifle (up to 6000 delivered). Introduction of further advanced designs was hampered by the outbreak of World War II and the start of the German occupation of Poland.

During the final months of World War II the factory's equipment was seized by the Germans and sent to Germany, while most of the buildings were demolished. After the war, in 1948 it was rebuilt as Fabryka Wyrobów Precyzyjnych im. gen. Świerczewskiego (General Świerczewski Precision Machinery Factory). Renamed as VIS after 1989, the company ceased production and sold off its assets. By 2008 all of the remaining buildings had been demolished to make way for a new residential district.
