= Karabinek wz. 1929 =

Karabinek wz. 29
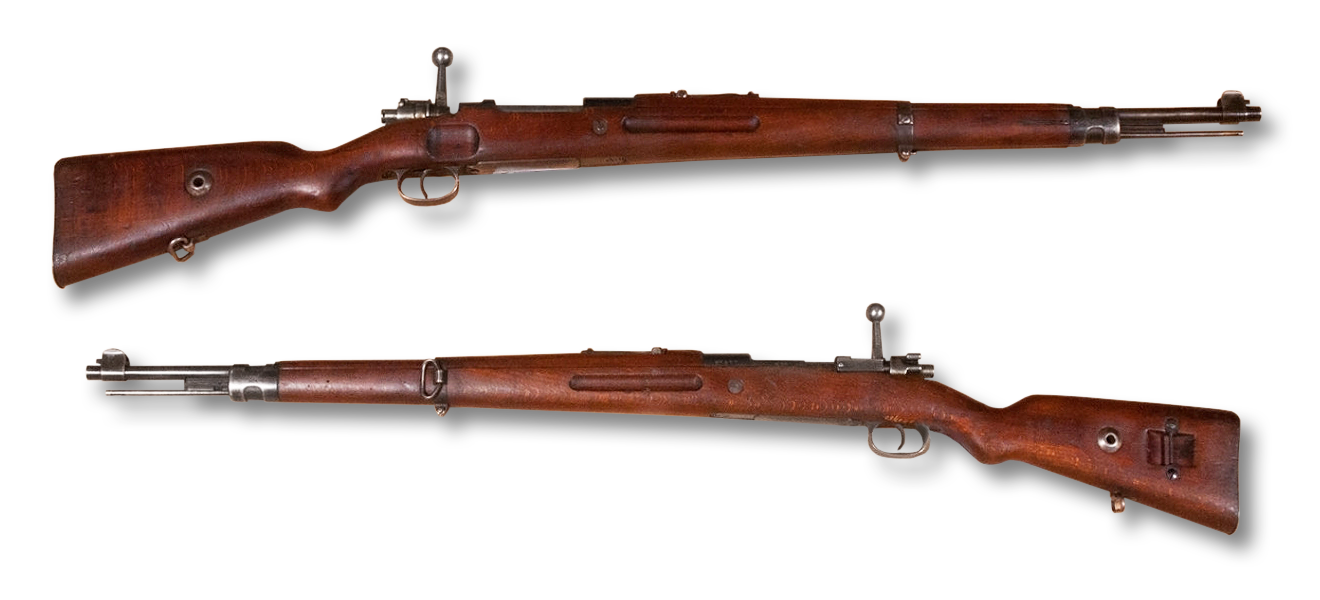
- Type: Service rifle
- Place of origin: Poland

Service history
- In service: 1930−1945
- Used by: See § Users
- Wars: Spanish Civil War; Second Sino-Japanese War; World War II

Production history
- Designed: 1929
- Manufacturer: Państwowa Fabryka Karabinów; Fabryka Broni
- Produced: 1930−1942
- No. built: 634,000

Specifications
- Mass: 4.0 kg (8.8 lb)
- Length: 1,100 mm (43.31 in)
- Barrel length: 600 mm (23.62 in)
- Cartridge: 7.92×57mm Mauser
- Caliber: 7.92 mm
- Action: Bolt action
- Rate of fire: Approx 15 round/min
- Muzzle velocity: 745 m/s (2,440 ft/s)
- Feed system: 5-round internal clip

The kbk wz. 29 (Polish: carbine pattern 1929) was a Polish bolt-action short rifle based on the German Kar98AZ. Identifying attributes include a 98/05 style mast bayonet lug ending directly beneath the front sight and winged protective ears to either side of the front sight blade. Cavalry models featured a turned-down bolt handle, and early versions had a stacking hook near the end of the stock on the right side.

== History ==
After regaining independence in 1918, the Polish Army was armed with weapons left over from the nations that occupied Poland during the Partition Era, including Russian M91 Mosin–Nagants, Austrian Steyr-Mannlichers, and German Gewehr 98s. French Berthiers and Lebels from the soldiers of the Blue Army were also on hand, as well as the Japanese Arisaka and guns from Great Britain such as the Lee–Enfield.

As a result, at the end of Polish-Soviet War in 1921, the Polish army was armed with approximately 24 types of guns and 22 rifles firing different ammunition. In an effort to reduce logistical difficulties, the Polish Army sought to adopt a single type of rifle. Conveniently, the Treaty of Versailles, having established the Free City of Danzig, gave the Polish Army access to the weapons-making facilities at the Danzig Arsenal, facilitating the choice of the Mauser 98 action as the basis for any new Polish military rifle. The Mauser was also arguably one of the best bolt-action rifles at the time and the best available to Poland. Production of the wz. 98 began in July 1922, after the Danzig machinery was moved to Warsaw and creating the National Rifle Factory in Radom.

Two years later, production of the wz. 98 rifles was stopped. The military sought to adopt an intermediate-length rifle, such as the Lee–Enfield, M1903 Springfield, or the German Karabiner 98a based on analyses of combat experience in World War I and the Polish-Soviet War.

Field use of the K98a rifles showed that the design was not fit for use as an infantry weapon (originally, the K98a had been developed as a weapon for auxiliary or special troops). The greatest flaw was the weak bayonet mount, as the bayonet lug would break off when hitting hard objects. The K98a also used a small-ring Mauser action, which complicated the production process. Following the postwar shift to large-ring carbines with 600 mm barrels and Gewehr 98-style bayonet lug/muzzle lengths, such as the Czechoslovak vz. 24, the decision was made to develop an intermediate model rifle for the Polish Army. The design was finalized in 1929. The new wz. 29 rifle was based on the old wz. 98 rifle, but with a shortened stock and barrel, stronger alloys for the receiver and barrel, a reinforced chamber, and increased dimensional tolerance in the action, allowing for easy interchangeability of parts. There were two versions of the rifle: Infantry models had straight bolt handles, while cavalry models had curved handles. Since both variations used the same stock, cavalry models had a cutout in the stock for the curved handle.

Production of the new weapons began in 1930 at the National Arms Factory in Radom. Despite the production of wz. 98a long rifles beginning in 1936, wz. 29 production continued until September 1939, with a total of approximately 264,000 carbines produced, including rifles produced for export. According to the Ministry of National Defence, a total of 7,900 wz. 29 carbines were sold abroad in 1937 alone. Deszczyński, citing arms export company SEPEWE records, stated that a large number of weapons including wz. 29s were exported to China and the Spanish Republic via intermediaries. (Note: According to Deszczyński, some rifles nominally shipped to China in 1936 were probably delivered to the Francoist forces instead; while the Republican forces obtained weapons that were nominally shipped to several countries, including: China, Greece, Mexico, Peru, and Venezuela.) During the occupation of Poland production of the wz. 29 continued under German supervision until 1942, with nearly 370,000 rifles supplied for the Wehrmacht as the Gewehr 29(p).

During the September Campaign, wz. 29 rifles were used by the Polish Army in the defense of Poland, against German troops using the similar Karabiner 98k. After the defeat of Poland, they were used by the guerrillas of the Polish Underground. Captured wz. 29 rifles were also used by the Wehrmacht as the Gewehr 298(p).

== Design ==
The Karabinek wz. 29 was a bolt-action carbine, with a typical Mauser-action lock, consisting of two large main lugs at the bolt head and a third safety lug at the rear. Ammunition was fed from a fixed two-row box magazine holding five rounds. The sights consisted of a barleycorn-type front sight with protective ears, and a tangent-type rear sight with a V-shaped rear notch; the rear sight was a tangent sight that was graduated up to 2,000 m (2,200 yd). The weapon could be fitted with a wz. 29 knife bayonet.

According to Matuszewski and Wojciechowski, the wz. 29 was easier to handle than the wz. 98 rifle, proved to be effective at ranges of 300–400 m (330–440 yd), and it was well-made, though it had a tendency of getting dirty quickly under field conditions, requiring the gun to be kept clean to avoid jams.

== -Gewehr 29/40- ==
This model was a clone of the Karabiner 98k built at the Radom factory for Germany. The Austrian firm Steyr was given control of the factory and they produced rifles for the Kriegsmarine and Luftwaffe. The name is a mixture of the German word for rifle gewehr, the last two digits of the Polish model number 29, and the last two digits of the year it was placed in production for the Germans 40. These rifles can be identified by the stamp G29/40 on their receiver. This model is also sometimes given the Fremdgerät country designation(ö) for österreichisch or Austria. The resulting designation would be Gewehr 29/40(ö).

== Users ==
- Afghanistan − 3,100 delivered in 1929
- China − 16,450 delivered in 1930−1931
- Nazi Germany − Made use of captured carbines. Production in occupied Poland was kept until 1942
- Kingdom of Hejaz and Nejd − 13,000 delivered in 1929−1930
- Mandatory Palestine − 1,697 delivered in 1936
- Second Polish Republic − Standard issue carbine used alongside Karabin wz. 98a rifles
- Soviet Union − Some captured in 1939
- Spanish Republic − About 88,000 carbines were exported in 1936−1938 according to Deszczyński, while Howson stated that only 25,000 carbines were delivered
- Spanish State − At least 9,300 delivered in 1936
- United States − 61 delivered in 1935
- Yugoslavia

=== Failed bids ===
- (Pahlavi dynasty) Persia − An offer to supply 50,000 rifles and 50 million rounds of ammunition was unsuccessful
- Turkey − Ordered 500 rifles, but only a handful of rifles (or none at all) were delivered before the invasion of Poland in 1939
