= Aldona Skirgiełło =

Polish politician (born 1977)

Aldona Anna Skirgiełło
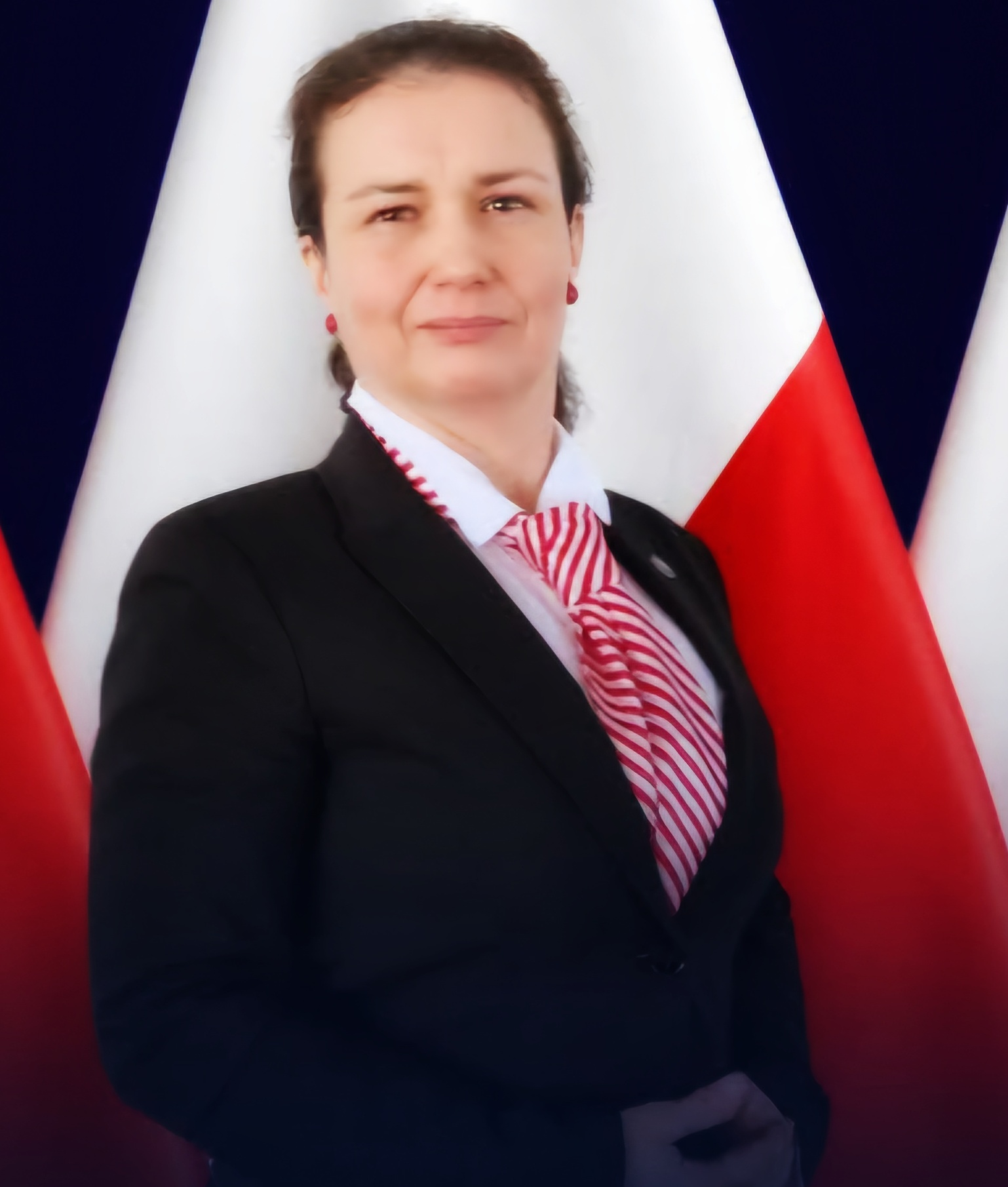
- Aldona Skirgiełło in 2025
- Born: 27 July 1977 (age 49); Warsaw, Poland
- Other name: Aldona from Podlasie
- Education: Anglia Ruskin University
- Occupations: Politician, actor, farmer
- Notable work: Aldona z Podlasia (2024)
- Television: Dona (2016); Wives of Podlasie (2024) (Polish: Żony Podlasia)
- Political party: Self-Defence

Aldona Anna Skirgiełło (born 27 July 1977) is a Polish politician, actor, and farmer. She is known for her appearance in the TTV series "Wives of Podlasie" (Polish: Żony Podlasia), where she played a star role. Skirgiełło was born in Warsaw, where she studied law and worked as a horse rider and photographer for 18 years. She abandoned her studies to emigrate to England, where she became a hippologist. She returned to Poland in 2014 and settled in Podlasie, deciding to live a "traditional" rural life, without running water nor electricity. After being featured in award-winning documentaries on Podlasie such as Dona, Skirgiełło was invited to the new TTV series "Wives of Podlasie" in March 2024, where she played the main role. Thanks to the series, she gained nationwide popularity and recognizability, and released her autobiography later in 2024.

Skirgiełło also became involved in Polish politics, expressing her interest to run for the first time in 2018. After her unsuccessful independent run in the 2018 Polish local elections, Skirgiełło became a member of the far-left party Self-Defence of the Republic of Poland, and ran on its behalf in the 2019 Polish parliamentary election for a Senate seat. Her run was unsuccessful, but she gained media attention, and sparked controversy for using an Orthodox church for campaign purposes. Skirgiełło ran again, in the 2024 Polish local elections, but also unsuccessfully. In January 2025, Self-Defence nominated Skirgiełło as the party's official candidate for the 2025 Polish presidential election. Skirgiełło bases her political persona on that of Andrzej Lepper, former leader of Self-Defence who gathered a large following in the 2020s despite dying in infamy in 2011.

== Biography ==
=== Early life ===
Aldona Skirgiełło was born on 27 July 1977 in Warsaw. She was raised by and named after her grandmother, Aldona Skirgiełło, who was the first Polish stewardess. In her youth, she worked as an horse rider in Służewiec, later a professional photographer for 18 years. Despite beginning an education in law at the University of Warsaw, she abandoned it to become an zootechnician. Skirgiełło explained her decision with her love for horses – she started horseriding when she was 2 years old.

Skirgiełło married for the first time in Poland and gave birth to her first daughter in 1998. Her second daughter died in a car accident at the age of 3. Skirgiełło was severely abused by her husband, and recalled being beat with fists and by beer can by her husband, often over petty reasons. After seven years of abuse, Skirgiełło ran away to a Catholic house for lone mothers run by nuns, where men were not allowed to enter. She filed for divorce there, which was granted.

=== Return to Poland ===
After the divorce, Skirgiełło left Poland for England in 2005, where she studied at the Anglia Ruskin University for 9 years. She graduated in two fields – hippologist and racing industry specialist. She worked at horse races in Newmarket, Suffolk, where she met her later husband, an English Gypsy Fred Samuels. The couple decided to return to back to Poland to settle into subsistence farming on a "traditional zagroda" in Podlasie, raising Gypsy Cobs and other farm animals. Since 2012, Skirgiełło became an editor for the Polish magazine World of Horses (Polish: Świat koni).

They settled in Wyczółki in 2014, and later in 2016 she moved to Stołbce. Skirgiełło later said that she was tired of living in the city, and was inspired by her husband's stories of living in trailers in 1980s. The couple chose Podlasie region, on the border with Belarus, because "it had not yet been so destroyed by civilization". Skirgiełło searched for a long time to find her "dream place". She and her husband attracted media attention in 2015 for their ascetic way of life, as they sought to recreate the way of life of Polish farmers in the 1960s. Their farm had neither running water nor electricity, and they promoted tourism in the region by offering to teach guests rural traditions and old crafts. She was also featured in a reportage concerning Orthodox Christians of Podlasie.

In 2016, Polish journalist Błażej Torański published an article about Skirgiełło, which discussed her life story and the radical change in her lifestyle that she settled for. TVP3 Białystok later released a documentary that sparked further interest in Skirgiełło. On 12 November 2016, journalist Alicja Grzechowiak was given a film award for her documentary film "Dona", which documented the life of Skirgiełło and her husband in Wyczółki. In late 2017, she became a widow as her husband died. She continued to live on the farm and to raise her son Witold as a lonely mother. In 2019, she became the president of the Nurzec-Stacja Community Development Association (Polish: Stowarzyszenie Rozwoju Gminy Nurzec-Stacja) that promotes agrotourism in the gmina. She ran a tavern and open-air museum, which she closed in 2024 after being given a role in a television series.

=== TV career ===
In early 2024, Skirgiełło again gained media attention, as the breeder of gypsy horses in Podlasie. The relative interest in her resulted in her being invited to documentary series. According to Skirgiełło, it was the 2016 documentary "Dona" about her life in particular that made television producers take interest in her. In March 2024, she starred in the TTV series "Wives of Podlasie" (Polish: Żony Podlasia). Skirgiełło gained popularity and recognizability through the series, becoming known as "Aldona from Podlasie". According to Rzeczpospolita, although she was known locally, her star role in the series made me her a public figure amongst broader, nationwide audience. Skirgiełło appealed to audience through her passion for horses and stories about the rural life and her childhood.

In September 2024, the second season of "Wives of Podlasie" started, where Skirgiełło once again played a star role. Skirgiełło also announced that she would soon publish her autobiography. A publisher house that Skirgiełło decided to enter an agreement with was Axis Mundi. Her biography was published on 22 November 2024, and Skirgiełło held a celebratory event in the public library of Siemianowice Śląskie, which was noted for high attendance. According to Radio Podlasie, Skirgiełło became recognizable thanks to the series, and the biography had exceeded sales expectations and already had to be reprinted two days after release.

Skirgiełło's autobiography gathered attention amongst feminist circles, and noted for detailed recollections of physical and mental abuse that she endured in her first marriage. By December 2024, Skirgiełło started holding more events related to her biography nationwide. In a radio interview, she expressed satisfaction with sales of her book and announced her plans to write more books.

=== 2025 presidential run and aftermath ===
In January 2025, Skirgiełło was nominated as the official presidential candidate of Self-Defence of the Republic of Poland, with speculation that she became a candidate "on the basis of the gained popularity" from "Wives of Podlasie". Skirgiełło herself claimed that the candidacy was proposed to her by the chairman of Samoobrona, which she accepted given her long-term association with the party. Along with Krzysztof Tołwiński of the Front party, Skirgiełło became the only 2025 presidential candidate to represent the agrarian and underdeveloped region of Podlasie.

Ultimately, Skirgiełło's presidential candidacy was unsuccessful as by the time of the deadline, she narrowly fell short of the 100,000 signatures needed to appear on the ballot. After the presidential election, it was reported that Skirgiełło might return to "Wives of Podlasie" for the third season, again in a star role. In September 2025, Skirgiełło confirmed that she is starred in the third season.

== Political activity ==
=== 2018 local election ===
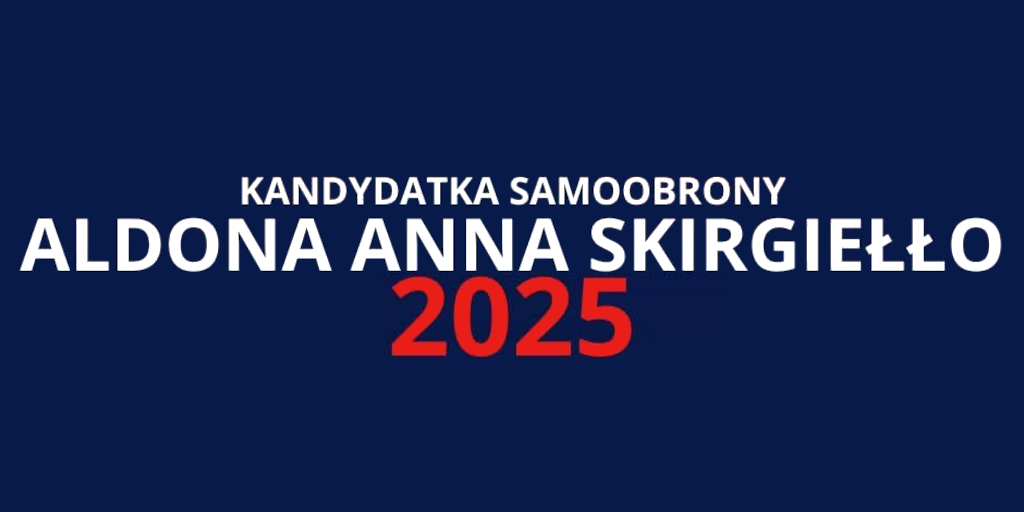
Logo of the Skirgiełło's 2025 Polish presidential election campaign.

In May 2018, Skirgiełło expressed her interest to enter local politics. She portrayed herself as an anti-establishment candidate, arguing that her gmina is a "black hole" that needs to be revitalized by investing in agritourism, and addressing the wealth inequality between the gmina's town and surrounding countryside. However, Skirgiełło was widowed shortly before the election. In the 2018 Polish local elections, she ran for Wójt of Nurzec-Stacja, winning 171 votes (10.14%).

After the local elections, she became a member of a far-left party Self-Defence of the Republic of Poland. She described herself as a representative of the "third way of the late Andrzej Lepper", expressing anti-capitalist views and proposing a non-capitalist economic system. She also calls for a parliamentary representation of national and ethnic minorities in Poland, especially Orthodox Christians; she also supports reestablishing economic and diplomatic relations with Belarus and Russia, protecting "traditional Christian values" and elimination of the LGBT card from Polish law. In her 2019 political campaign, she declared: "Let's start from the basics. Let's start by rebuilding what should be a strong foundation for an independent Poland. Currently, Polish agriculture and the Polish economy are still being destroyed, on a much larger scale than a few years ago."

=== 2019 Senate run ===
In the 2019 Polish parliamentary election, Skirgiełło ran for a Senate seat in the constituency no. 61, which covers Gmina Bielsk Podlaski, Gmina Hajnówka, Gmina Siemiatycze and the Wysokie Mazowieckie County. Skirgiełło sparked controversy by posting her political banner on the fence of the Orthodox Church of Simeon Stylites in Brańsk, highlighting her proposal to give Orthodox ethnic minorities in Poland parliamentary representation. Local parish priest initially defended Skirgiełło, but eventually asked her take down her ad after negative coverage. In the election, she won 5,048 votes (5.91%) in total, and did not win the seat. Despite her poor result, her campaign was highly visible in media thanks to her name recognizability; she considered her result satisfactory, stating: "Despite the fact that some claimed it no longer existed, Samoobrona is back and it is here to stay and work."

=== 2024 local election ===
Skirgiełło also ran in the 2024 Polish local elections, where she once again registered as a candidate for Wójt of her gmina Nurzec-Stacja. In her program, she called for implementing social support for struggling farmers, expanding social safety net in the countryside, cutting income tax rates for farms, and tightened control of food import to protect Polish agriculture. She won 4.95% of the vote and failed to win the seat, and the incumbent Wójt was re-elected with an overwhelming margin. Norbert Jadczuk of Law and Justice won with over 60% of the popular vote, which meant that there was no run-off. Apart from Jadczuk and Skirgiełło, there were two other candidates for the seat.

=== 2025 presidential election ===
In 2025, Skirgiełło declared her candidacy for the 2025 Polish presidential election. She described herself as a "horse breeder, spiritual development mentor, singing songwriter, independent woman and highly controversial local scandalist". Skirgiełło's presidential candidacy opened discussions about gender inequality in Poland, and the possibility of women playing a bigger role in Polish politics. She was nominated as the official presidential candidate of Self-Defence of the Republic of Poland at the party's convention in January 2025. This was the first time since the 2010 Polish presidential election that the party nominated its own presidential candidate, and is seen as a part of a revival of interest in the party and its deceased controversial leader Andrzej Lepper.

Skirgiełło was described as "the voice of people forgotten by the elites: farmers, manual workers, women from the countryside". She stated: "A woman from Podlasie must be both tough and committed, and life in the province is not just folklore from a TV series, but a daily struggle for dignity and social justice." Similarly to her 2019 Senate run, Skirgiełło invoked and referenced her Orthodox faith, including posting photos with Orthodox priests. Her 2025 campaign was noted for socially conservative, anti-immigration and pro-Russian messages. She became controversial for posting videos from the Russian television channel RT, with comments such as "Russian President Putin says that the European elites will soon bow down to Donald Trump and eagerly show their loyalty." and "Russian President Putin claims that if the US presidency had not been “stolen" from Donald Trump in 2020, the Ukrainian crisis would never have happened". Speaking of her view on the Russo-Ukrainian War, Skirgiełło stated:

Until not so long ago, the Wołyń Massacre was in the foreground, the Wołyń atrocities were emphasized, but [not anymore] since the Special Military Operation, and I do not consider it a war, because Russia entered Ukraine to, among others, fight Nazism, and as we know, the Nazi Azov Battalion has officially been a part of the Ukrainian army since 2014, and since 2014, oddly enough, the invasion of Donetsk and Lugansk had started. It is simply a civil war, between Ukrainians and Ukrainians. […] We know what the textbooks for Ukrainian children look like in schools, Stepan Bandera is shown as a national hero there.

Skirgiełło applauded the President of USA Donald Trump for signing an executive order stating that there are only two genders, stating that she too is opposed to 'gender ideology', and that her homosexual friends are also 'against the LGBTQ+ movement'. When asked about her prospect of victory, she stated "I won't win the election anyway, but I will stir things up." Her political slogan became a quote by Andrzej Lepper: "You don't have to give to people; stop taking from people, and people can take care of themselves!" Gazeta Wyborcza described Skirgiełło as anti-liberal and Eurosceptic, while Fronda described her as strongly anti-Ukrainian and claimed that her candidacy, along with that of pro-Russian Maciej Maciak, was promoted by Belarusian state media.

In regards to the economy, Skirgiełło called for nationalization of the Polish industry, stating: "Polish land should be in Polish hands. The same goes for Polish industry and the Polish economy. We cannot allow foreign capital to enter our country and start ruling and pushing its way in. Those who have stolen from Poland and continue to steal from it should be brought to justice and will be brought to justice." She opposed capitalism, and referring to the words of John Paul II, stated: "It is unacceptable that the only alternative after the fall of communism is capitalism. For 10 years, from 1979 to 1989, thieves in white gloves prepared the division of Poland. Now, something new is coming, something new has awakened." Skirgiełło supported expanding social safety net, and argued that the social welfare policies of Law and Justice, such as the +500 Family Program, were coopted from Samoobrona, and criticized the privileged position of Ukrainian refugees in Poland regarding welfare, pensions, and employment benefits.

Despite a well-publicized candidacy, Skirgiełło did not manage to gather the 100,000 signatures needed to appear on the ballot on time. At the day of the deadline, 4 April, she narrowly fell short, having gathered around 93,000 signatures. Skirgiełło declared that she would not step down from politics, and would to work on expanding party structures and building a voter base for parliamentary elections. She attributed her unsuccessful run to Samoobrona having been "weakened by external influences that are destroying it". On 12 April, Skirgiełło criticized the party, stating that party members did not gather signatures for her and that no campaign team was organized.

==== Endorsement ====
On 13 May 2025, Skirgiełło announced her support for Grzegorz Braun, the candidate of the Confederation of the Polish Crown. She argued that should he become president, Braun would dissolve the Sejm and trigger a snap election, which would end the Third Cabinet of Donald Tusk. Skirgiełło called Braun a choice for "those who want a strong, sovereign, and authentic Poland."

Her endorsement ran contrary to Samoobrona, which endorsed Karol Nawrocki, an independent candidate supported by Law and Justice, instead. However, the former vice-chairman and spokesman of Samoobrona, Mateusz Piskorski, who is also the leader of Zmiana, is a member of Braun's electoral committee.

In the second round of the presidential election, Skirgiełło appealed to vote against Rafał Trzaskowski.

== Personal life ==
Skirgiełło was married to Fred Samuels, an English Gypsy, but became widowed in 2017. She has one son, Witold. She also had two daughters – first was born in 1998 but does not keep contact with her mother, while Skirgiełło's second daughter died in car accident at 3 years old. According to hejnakon.pl and TVP journalist Alicja Grzechowiak, she is a descendant of Grand Duke of Lithuania Skirgiełło. She is an Eastern Orthodox Christian.

== Electoral history ==
=== Senate ===
Election year	Party	# of votes	% of vote	District	Elected?
2019	Self-Defence of the Republic of Poland	5,048	5.91%	Senate Constituency no. 61	No

=== Wójt of Nurzec-Stacja ===
Election year	Party	# of votes	% of vote	Elected?
2018	Independent	171	10.14%	No
2024	Self-Defence of the Republic of Poland	78	4.95%	No
