= Grabarka Holy Mount =

Monastery in Grabarka-Klasztor, Poland

Monastery of Saints Martha and Mary on the Grabarka Holy Mount
- Monaster Świętych Marty i Marii na Świętej Górze Grabarce (Polish)
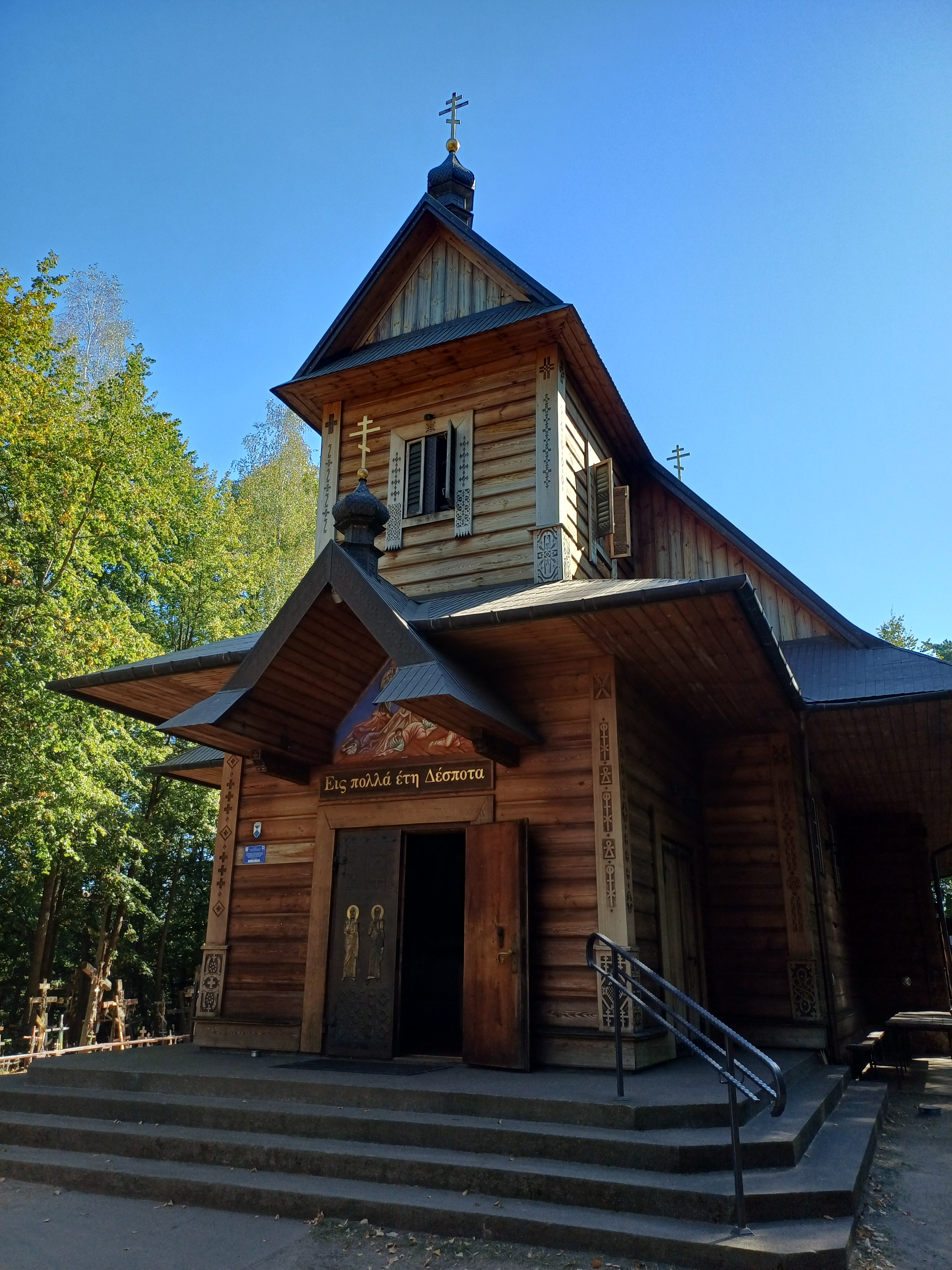
- Interactive map of Monastery of Saints Martha and Mary on the Grabarka Holy Mount

Monastery information
- Order: Polish Orthodox Church
- Established: 25 November 1947 (modern form)

People
- Founder: Maria (Komstadius)
- Abbess: Hermiona (Szczur)

Site
- Location: Grabarka-Klasztor, Poland
- Coordinates: 52°25′00″N 23°00′21″E
- Website: www.grabarka.pl

Grabarka Holy Mount (Polish: Święta Góra Grabarka) is a mount located next to the village of the same name in the Nurzec-Stacja Commune, Siemiatycze County, Podlaskie Voivodeship in eastern Poland. It is the most important place of religious worship for Orthodox believers in Poland. The complex includes nunnery of Saints Martha and Mary (Polish: Monaster Świętych Marty i Marii na Świętej Górze Grabarce), established in 1947, as well as three monastery churches (the Transfiguration of Jesus Christ Church, the Icon of Our Lady "The Joy of All Who Sorrow" and the refectory church of the Dormition of the Most Holy Theotokos). The main monastery church, the Transfiguration of Jesus Christ Church is also a parish church. The monastery, Orthodox churches and two Pilgrim Houses (wooden and brick) make up the Grabarka-Klasztor settlement. There is also an Orthodox cemetery in the settlement. The complex has 9 ha.

== History ==
=== The beginnings of the cult in Grabarka ===
Antoni Mironowicz associates the beginnings of the sanctuary with the cult of the miraculous icon of Christ the Savior, which was particularly venerated already in the 13th century in the church in nearby Mielnik. According to local tradition, during the Tatar invasions, the monks taking care of the icon were supposed to hide with the holy image in the surrounding forests, and eventually found their way to Góra Grabarka. The same monks were to initiate a new period of worship of the miraculous icon, which was expressed in giving special importance to the celebrations associated with the feast of the Transfiguration of Jesus on August 19. It was recorded that already in the 14th century, in the areas adjacent to the Mielnicka Forest, special importance was attached to this holiday. The feast of the Transfiguration of the Lord is commonly called by the Orthodox population in the Białystok region the feast of Spas, which is considered a derivative of the earlier cult of the icon of Spas (Savior) existing in the vicinity of Grabarka (or in Grabarka itself).

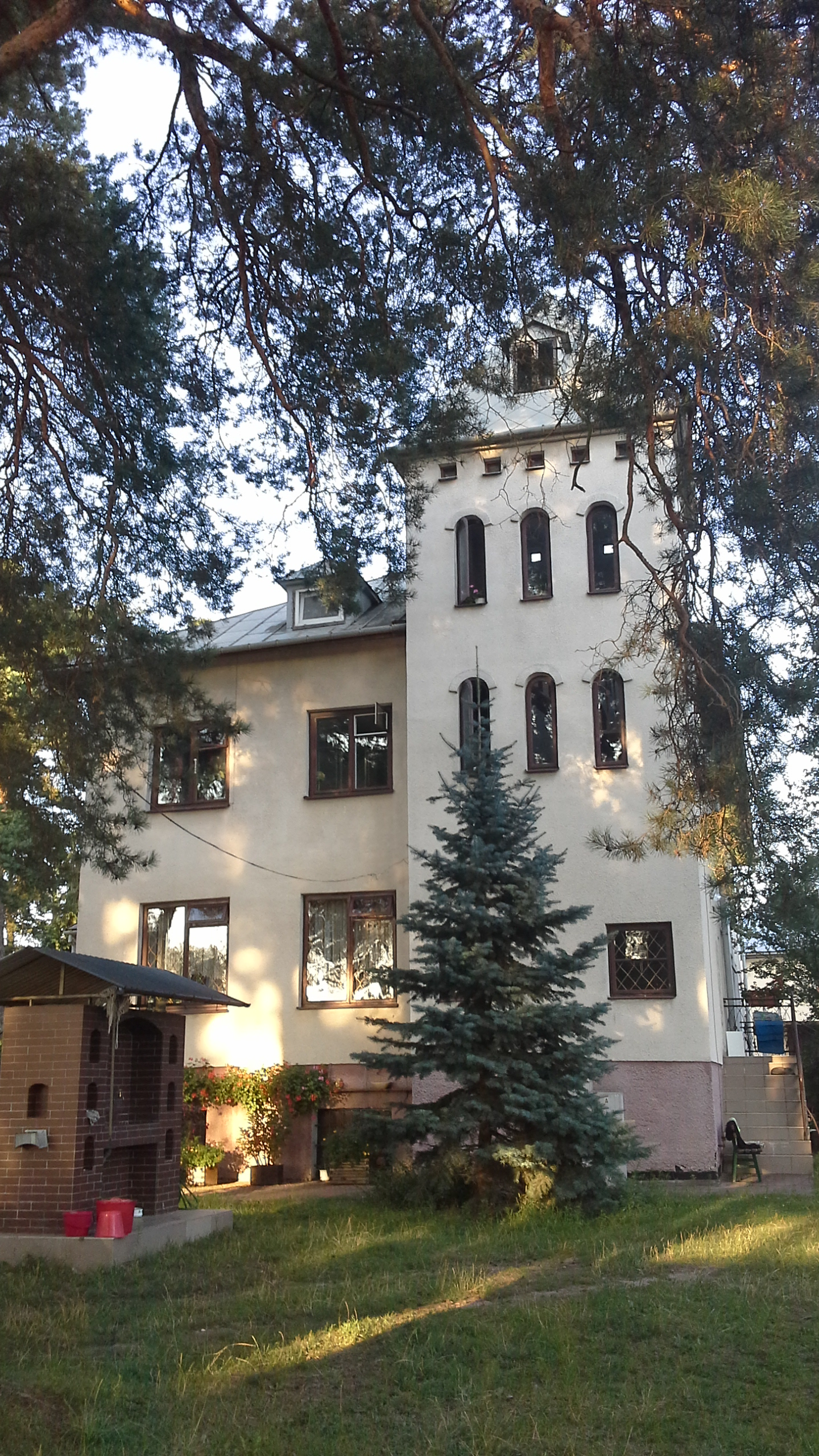
The monastery building

Historian Józef Maroszek has a different opinion about the beginnings of Grabarka, according to whom the first cult center in Grabarka was founded at the beginning of the 18th century as a Greek Catholic sanctuary. In his opinion, information about the existence of a temple with roots dating back to the Middle Ages, in the light of documents, can be considered as having more in common with legends than with historical truth. According to preserved accounts, in July 1710 a cholera epidemic broke out in nearby Siemiatycze. It caused panic among the city's inhabitants, who began to leave en masse, hiding in the surrounding forests until the epidemic ended in winter. This event should be associated with the establishment of a chapel and a cult center in Grabarka, initiated by the Uniate metropolitan of Kiev and abbot of Supraśl, Lev Kiszka. This is confirmed by a document from July 1, 1717, in which the bishop agreed to conduct services in the chapel on Święta Góra. Documents of the pastoral visitation from 1726 mention the existence of a "new chapel" in Grabarka. Transfiguration of the Lord. The chapel was described as a structure with a timber roof and two windows[4]. The cult of the Transfiguration of the Lord developed significantly. On June 26, 1763, Bishop Felicjan Filip Wołodkowicz, and on May 20, 1789, due to the efforts of the Bishop of Włodzimierz and Brzesko, Simeon Młocki, Pope Pius VI granted a 15-year indulgence for pilgrims visiting Grabarka. Before 1798, a new chapel was built in place of the previous one. According to the description of the Uniate priest Antoni Duchnowski was larger than the previous one, it had a main altar with a painting of the Holy Trinity and the Transfiguration of the Lord, a ciborium for communicants and the host, two side altars, 7 windows, a separate choir, a presbytery and a porch. It was also mentioned that the chapel had the privileges of indulgences from the Holy See, which means that even then Grabarka was an important pilgrimage center, and the water from the stream flowing through it was considered miraculous.

=== Grabarka in the 19th and early 20th centuries ===
The partitions of the Polish-Lithuanian Commonwealth placed the Siemiatycze County initially in the Prussian Partition, and then, under the Treaties of Tilsit, these areas were annexed to Russia in 1807. In 1839, a decree was issued by Tsar Nicholas I of Russia liquidating the Uniate Church in the Russian Empire. For the first few years after this event, the church was used to hold services for the Uniate population, even though it was already served by Orthodox clergy. This could have been a cause of disputes between denominations and had a negative impact on the condition of the temple. In 1866, Kwiercetus described the terrible condition of the forest chapel, which had no roof or floor. Despite this, large numbers of pilgrims still arrived on August 6. In 1884, priest Józef Gereminowicz began the renovation of the chapel in Grabarka, which lasted 11 years. New walls, ceiling, floor, foundations, roof and iconostasis were built in the church, while the interior of the temple was expanded.

After World War I, the church in Grabarka was kept in good condition, and because there was a cemetery next to it and funeral services were held there, it was not closed during the revindication of Eastern Orthodox churches in the Second Polish Republic. Throughout the interwar period, services were also held in the church several times a year for the numerous believers. The church in Grabarka did not suffer any damage during World War II.

=== Grabarka in the modern borders of Poland ===
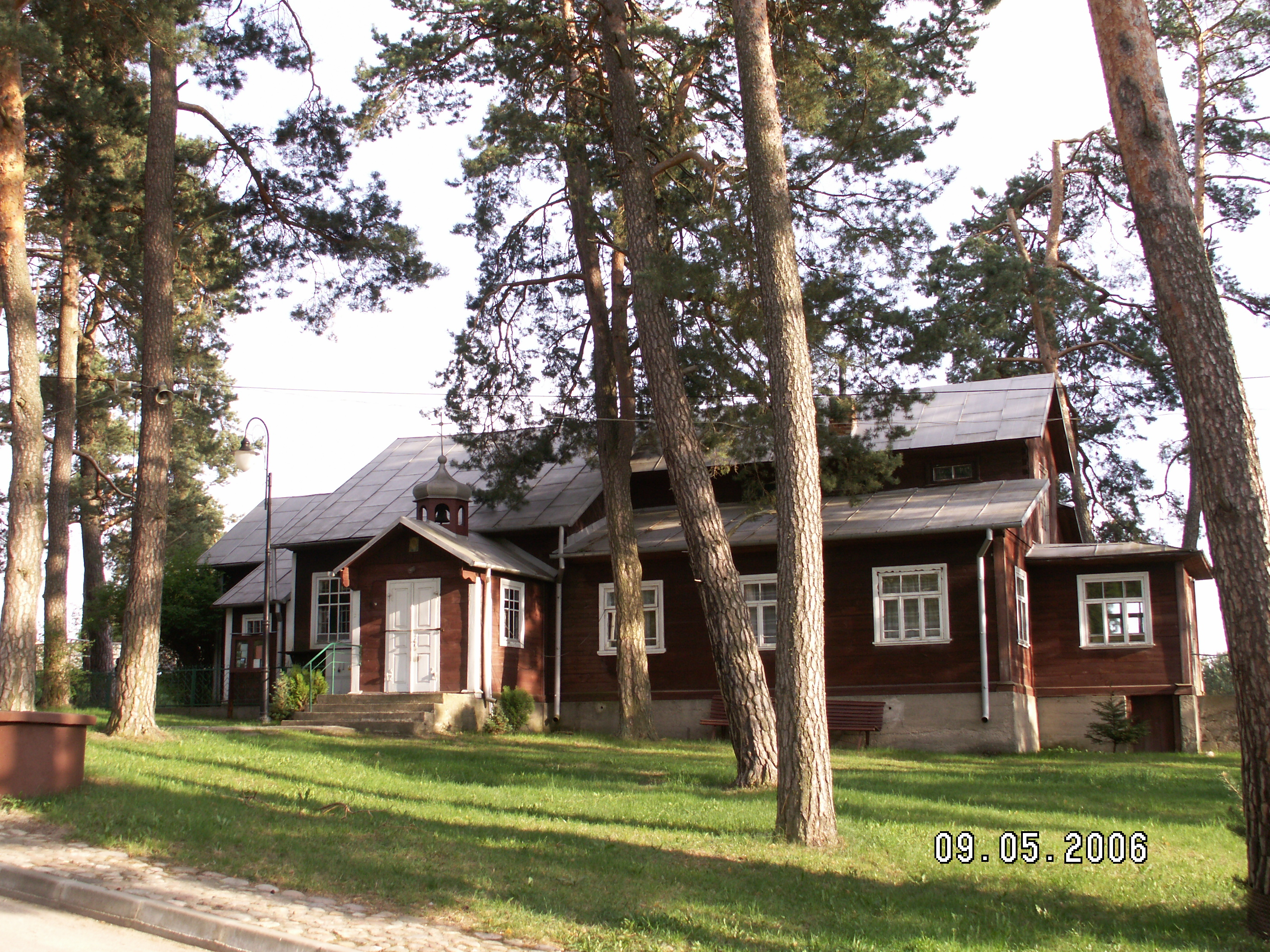
Orthodox church of Icon of Our Lady in Grabarka

With the changes in borders in 1945, the status of the Polish Orthodox Church also changed - in the post-war era of Poland there was not a single Orthodox nunnery that could have become a place of residence for several Orthodox nuns who managed to survive the war in the country. In 1947, the Orthodox Bishop of Białystok, Timothy, proposed locating a new monastery on Święta Góra near the village of Grabarka. On November 25, 1947, the monastery was officially established.

The first superior of the congregation was Schimniszka Maria (Komstadius), with whom two more sisters arrived in Grabarka at the end of 1947. In 1948, eight nuns served, and in August of the same year, the congregation celebrated the feast of the Transfiguration of the Lord for the first time. The first years of the monastery's existence were accompanied by great financial difficulties, and the sisters' existence was made especially difficult by the lack of living quarters. At that time, on Góra Grabarka there was only a wooden church of the Transfiguration and a small guardhouse, uninhabitable. Initially, the nuns spent the night in the bell tower of the old Orthodox church.

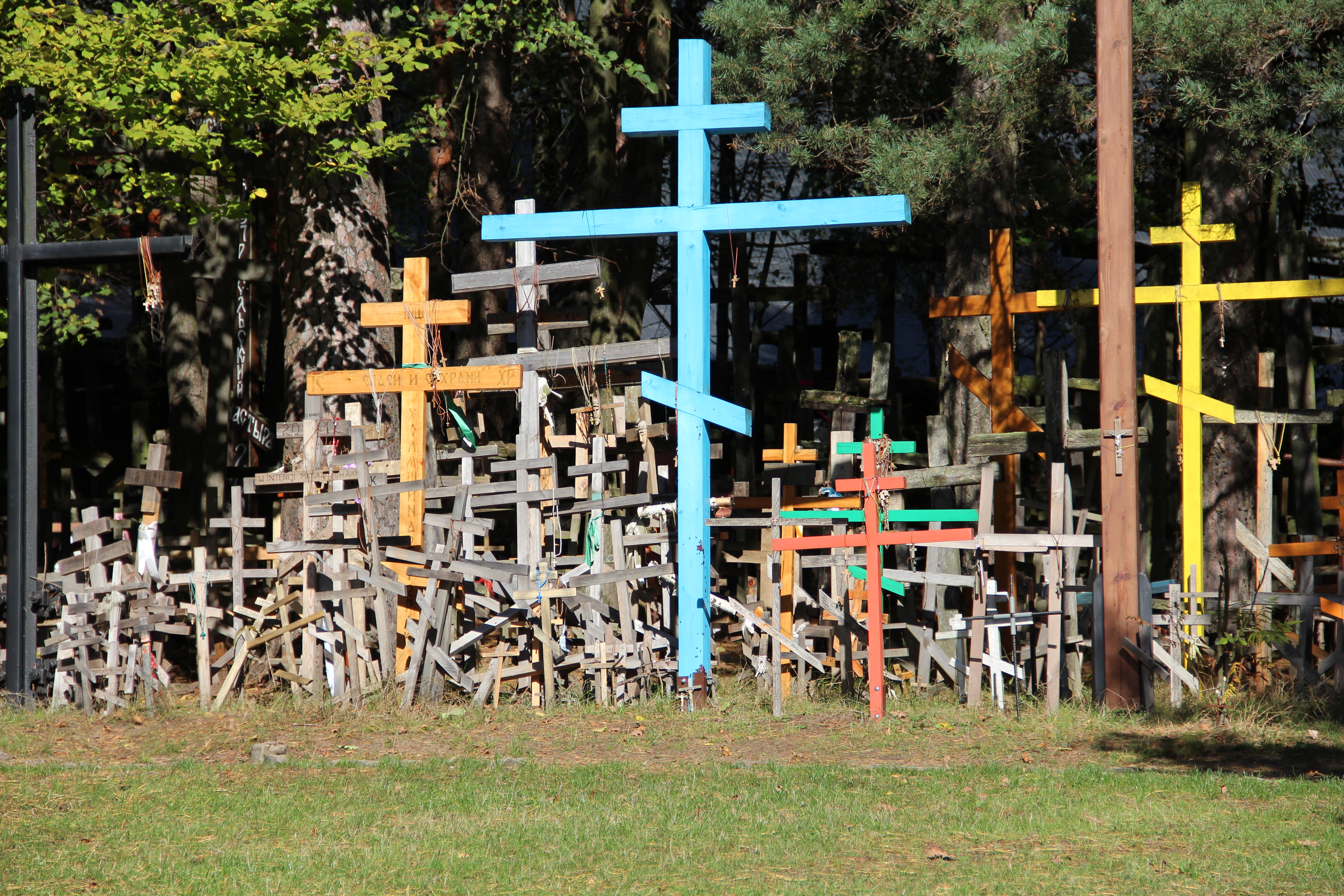
Orthodox crosses

In 1948, an Orthodox parish was established at the monastery, which included the villages of Grabarka, Szumiłówka, Oksiutycze, Pawłowicz, Homoty, Szerzenie and Hałasówka. In 1950, the parish had 560 believers.

In 1956, work was completed on the construction of a winter church dedicated to the Icon of Our Lady "Joy of All Afflicted" with a two-story residential building adjacent to it from the west. This church is located approximately one hundred meters south of the main monastery temple.

In the years 1961–1963, when Ihumenia Barbara (Grosser) was the superior of the monastery, restoration and iconographic works were carried out in the main monastery church of the Transfiguration of the Lord. The interior of the chapel received a new - referring to the traditional - design by Adam Stalony-Dobrzański and Jerzy Nowosielski, professors of the Krakow Academy of Fine Arts. In 1967, there were 20 nuns in the monastery, the largest number in the history of the monastery.

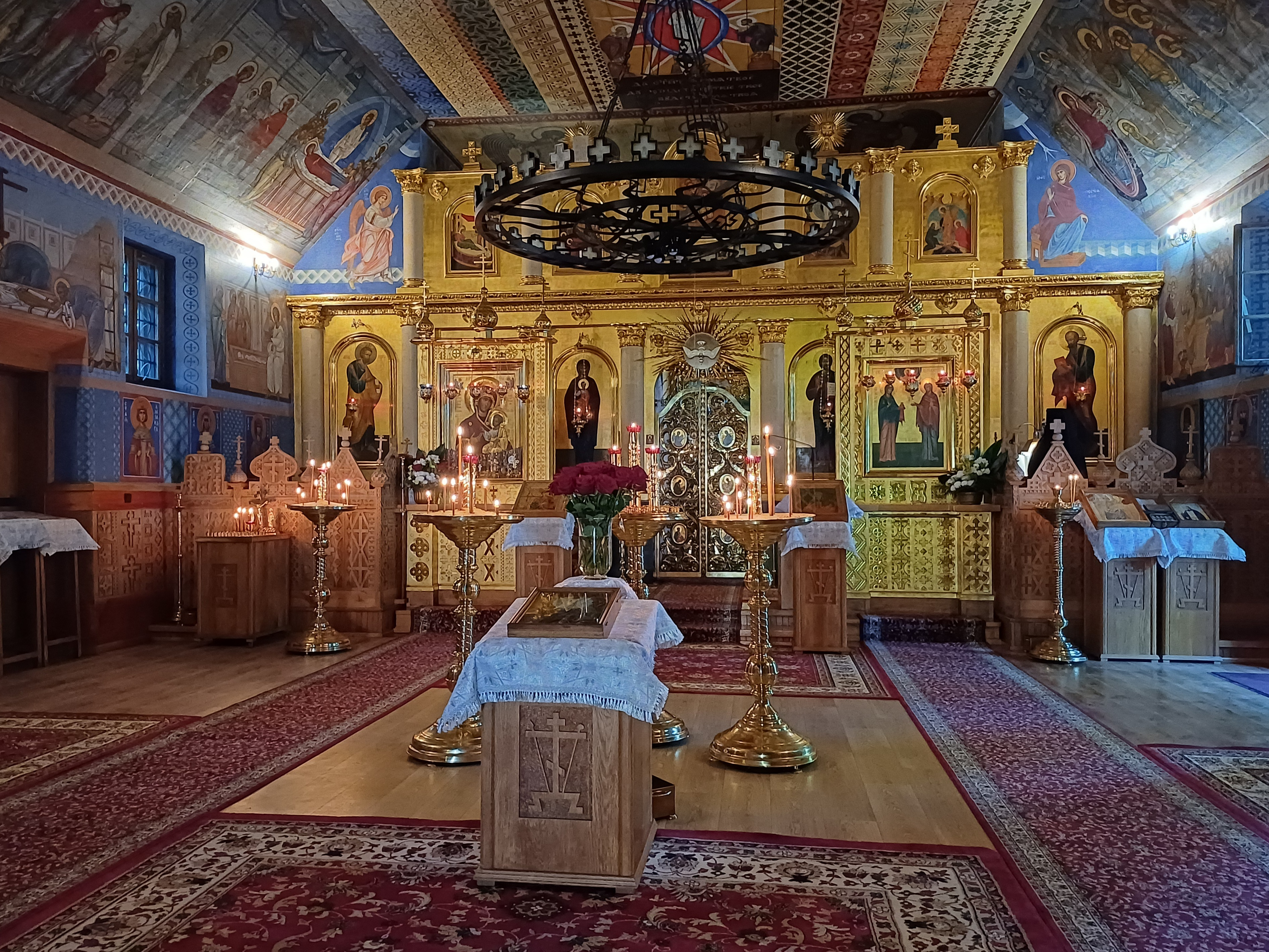
Interior of the Church of the Transfiguration of Jesus Christ

In the years 1977–1981, a new brick monastic house was built, with a spacious refectory church dedicated to the Dormition of the Mother of God. The refectory church was consecrated on July 3, 1981, by the then bishop of Lublin (later archbishop of Łódź and Poznań), Szymon (Romańczuk).

In the 1980s, there was a revival of the tradition of mass Orthodox pilgrimages to August celebrations on the occasion of the Transfiguration of the Lord. In 1986, the first walking pilgrimage from Białystok began and continues to this day. In addition, Orthodox Christians make pilgrimages to the August celebrations from, among others, Sokółka, Czarna Białostocka, Hajnówka, Bielsk Podlaski, Drohiczyn, Mielnik, Siemiatycze, Grodzisk, Jabłeczna and Warsaw. The importance of the Holy Mountain of Grabarka as a pilgrimage center increased in the 1980s to such an extent that at the end of the decade several tens of thousands of people participated in the celebration of the Transfiguration of the Lord. In 1980, the first annual May gathering of Orthodox youth took place, which gave rise to the Orthodox Youth Brotherhood.

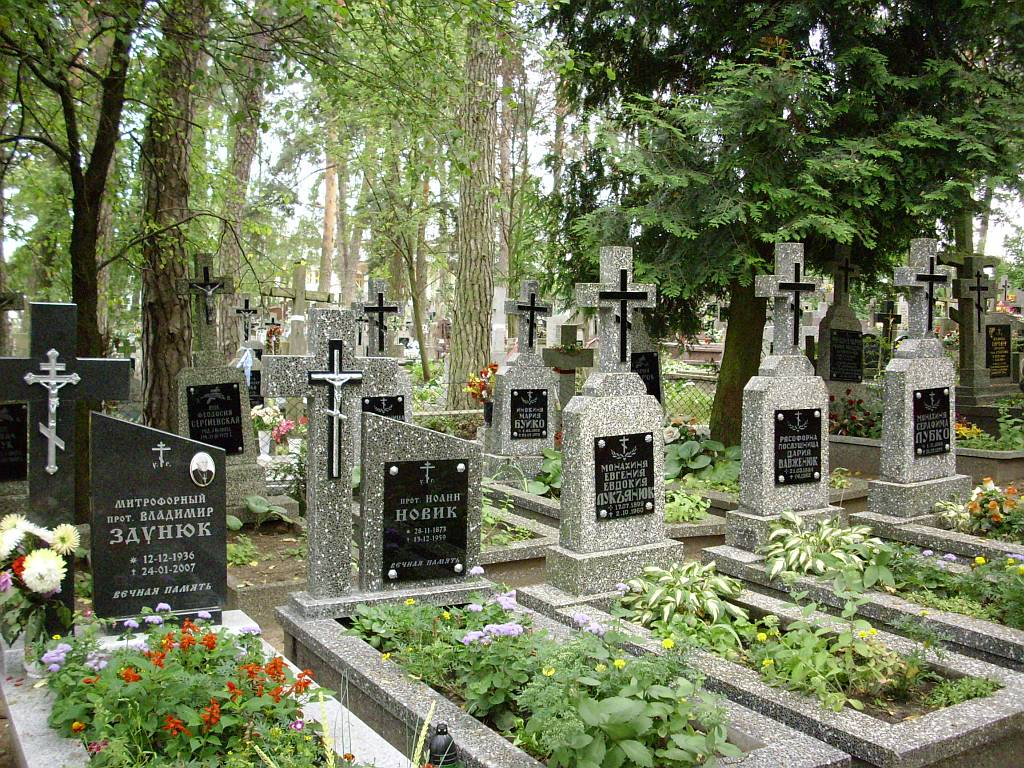
Monastery cemetery

After the death of Barbara's mother, Ihumenia Ludmiła (Polakowska) became the superior in 1986. On the night of July 12–13, 1990, the main monastery church of the Transfiguration of the Lord was set on fire. The fire completely consumed the entire temple. Only the Gospel book and two icons survived - St. Nicholas and the Savior. After the fire, the temple was immediately rebuilt in its previous shape. The rebuilt church was consecrated on May 17, 1998, by Metropolitan Sawa. The walls and ceiling of the new church were covered with polychrome by Jarosław Wiszenko. It referred to patterns known from the destroyed temple. The icons in the iconostasis and on the walls of the church were made by Michał and Barbara Pieczonka. The corners of the walls, window and door frames were covered with bas-reliefs depicting various images of the cross (author Wiaczesław Szum).

Since 1995, the superior of the monastery has been Sister Hermione (Szczur) (in 1998, raised to the dignity of ihumenia).

In 2000, during the feast of the Transfiguration of the Lord, the central Orthodox celebration of the two thousand years of Christianity took place in Grabarka. The monastery was then gifted with a copy of the Iwierska Icon of the Theotokos, made on Mount Athos, which was placed in the main monastery temple in a special kyote as one of the main sanctities of the monastery.

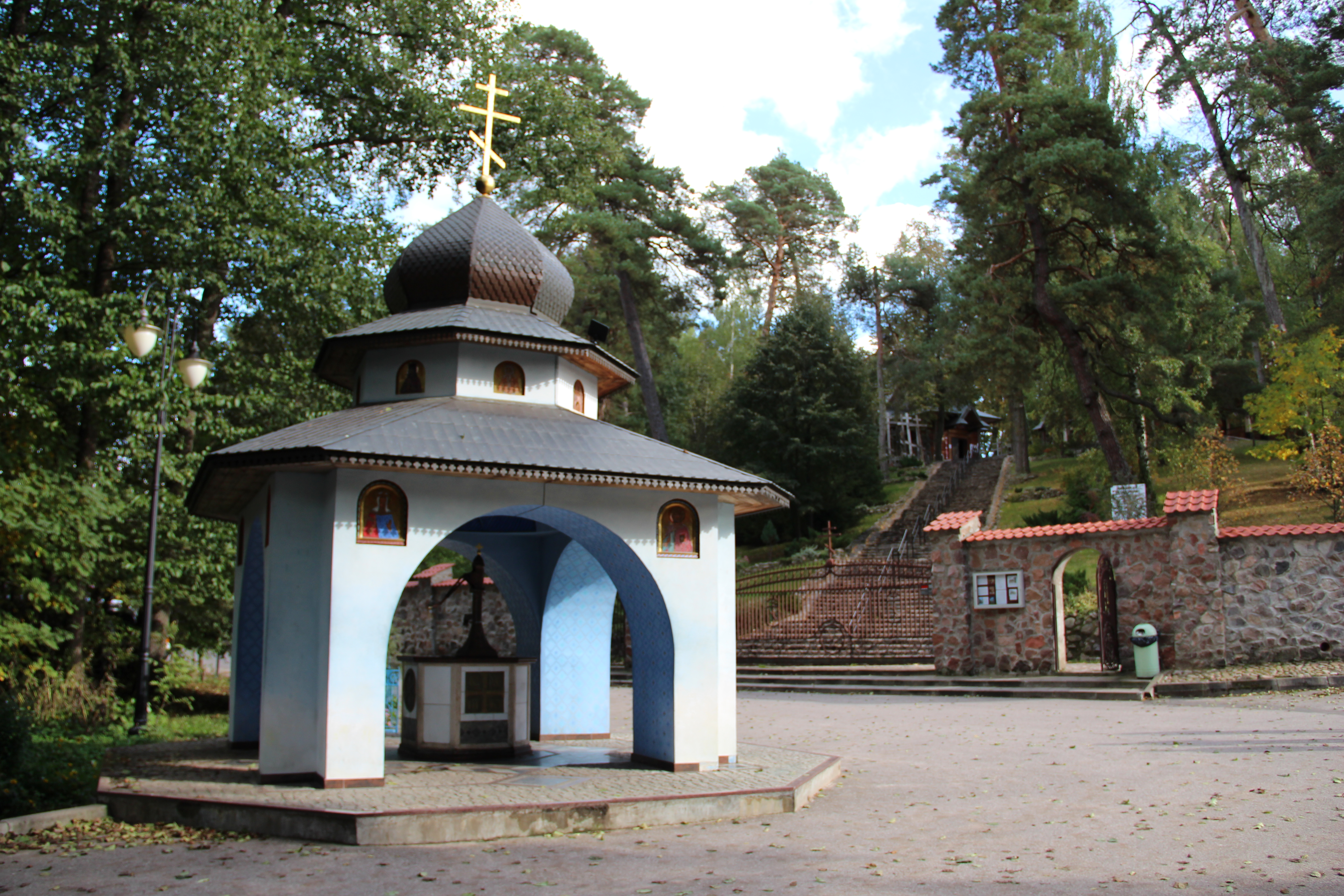
The holly well

In addition, Grabarka is a permanent point of visits for the heads of individual canonical Orthodox Churches. The place was visited in particular by Patriarch Bartholomew I of Constantinople (October 1998), Patriarch Teoctist Arăpașu (November 2000), Patriarch Peter VII (August 2001), Patriarch Pavle (October 2001), Bishop Anastasios (May 2003), Archbishop Christodoulos (August 2003), Archbishop Leo (October 2006). On August 18–19, the Church's superiors took part in the celebration of the Transfiguration of the Lord: in 2012 - the head of the Russian Orthodox Church, Patriarch Kirill I of Moscow and All Russia, in 2016 - Patriarch John X of Antioch, and in 2018 – the head of the Orthodox Church in America, Metropolitan Tikhon of All America and Canada and Patriarch Theodore II of Alexandria.

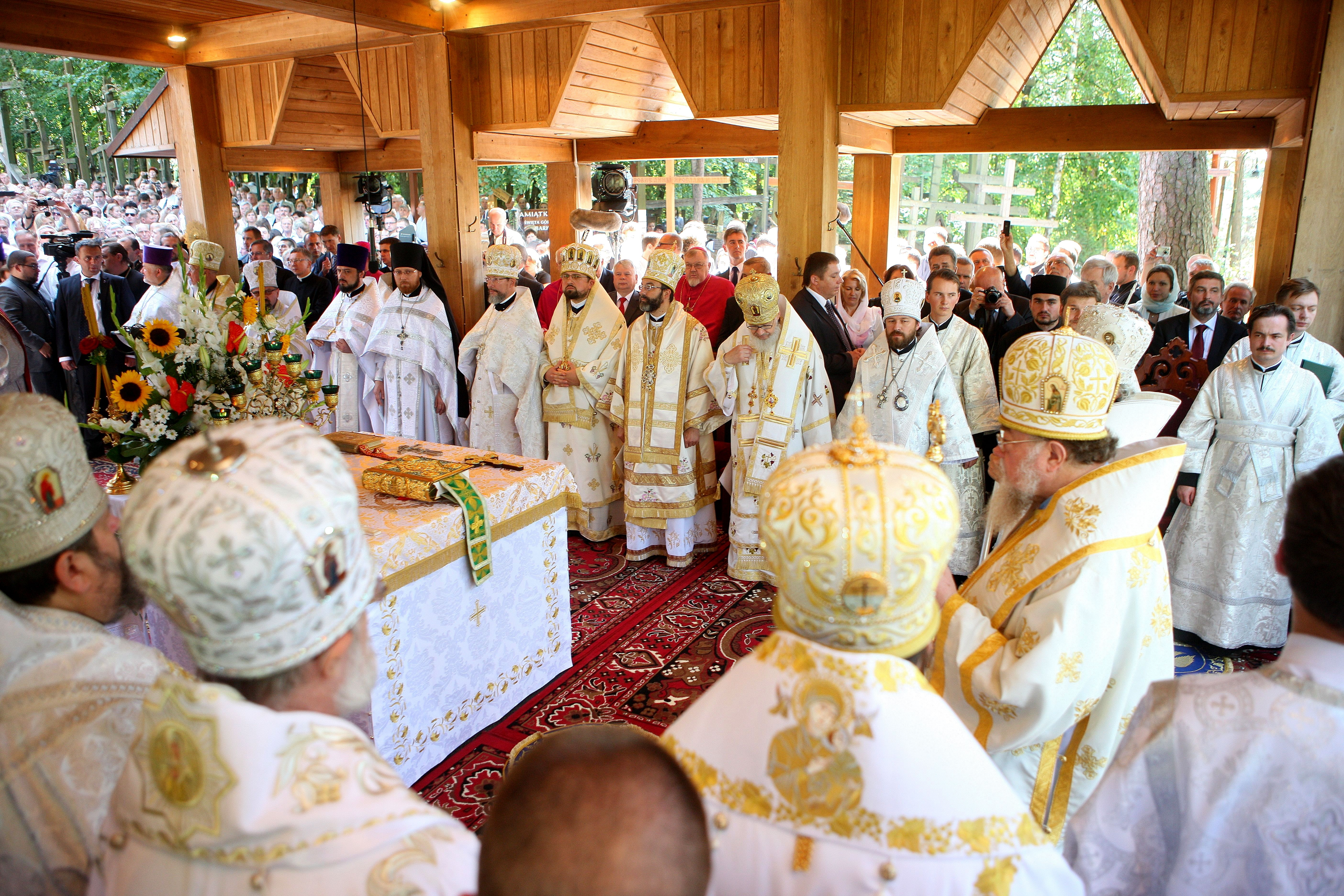
Exterior altar in Grabarka. The facility is located near the main monastery church and is used for liturgical celebrations

In the first years of the 21st century, a spacious brick pilgrim's house was built in the monastery complex, a fence was built around the Holy Mountain, a new dome was built over the well and asphalt was laid on the road to the monastery gate. In the years 2010–2016, a thorough renovation of the auxiliary church of the Icon of Our Lady of All Sorrowful Joy was carried out (the stairs, woodwork, bell tower, floor, internal walls and choir were renovated); these works were made possible thanks to foreign financial resources obtained as part of the project "Eastern Slavic Cultural Heritage - conservation, renovation, digitization of historic Orthodox churches". After completing the renovation, the church was solemnly consecrated on May 21, 2017, by Metropolitan Sava, assisted by hierarchs and numerous clergy from Poland and Ukraine.

In 2013, the Monastery of Saints Martha and Mary was the winner of the "Podlaskie Brand of the Year" competition. Holy Mountain Grabarka was visited (on the feast of the Transfiguration of the Lord) by the incumbent presidents of Poland - Bronisław Komorowski (2011, 2014) and Andrzej Duda (2015).

In 2022, there were 15 sisters in the monastery, including 9 nuns.
