= Nurzec (disambiguation) =

The Nurzec is a river in eastern Poland.

Nurzec may also refer to:

- Nurzec, Bielsk County in Podlaskie Voivodeship (north-east Poland)
- Nurzec, Siemiatycze County in Podlaskie Voivodeship (north-east Poland)
