= Abovitz =

Abovitz is a surname. Notable people with the surname include:

- Meyer Abovitz (1876–1941), Russian rabbi
- Rony Abovitz (born 1971), American entrepreneur
