= Nurzec-Kisielewo =

- Village
- Location within Poland
- Coordinates: 52°27′59″N 23°09′31″E
- Country: Poland
- Voivodeship: Podlaskie
- County: Siemiatycze
- Gmina: Nurzec-Stacja

Nurzec-Kisielewo [ˈnuʐɛt͡s kiɕɛˈlɛvɔ] is a village in the administrative district of Gmina Nurzec-Stacja, within Siemiatycze County, Podlaskie Voivodeship, in north-eastern Poland, close to the border with Belarus.
