= Gajówka, Podlaskie Voivodeship =

Gajówka
- Village
- Location within Poland
- Coordinates: 52°28′56″N 23°04′03″E
- Country: Poland
- Voivodeship: Podlaskie
- County: Siemiatycze
- Gmina: Nurzec-Stacja

Gajówka [ɡaˈjufka] is a village in the administrative district of Gmina Nurzec-Stacja, within Siemiatycze County, Podlaskie Voivodeship, in north-eastern Poland, close to the border with Belarus.
