= Church of St. Demetrius, Żerczyce =

Orthodox church in Żerczyce, Poland

Church of the Holy Trinity
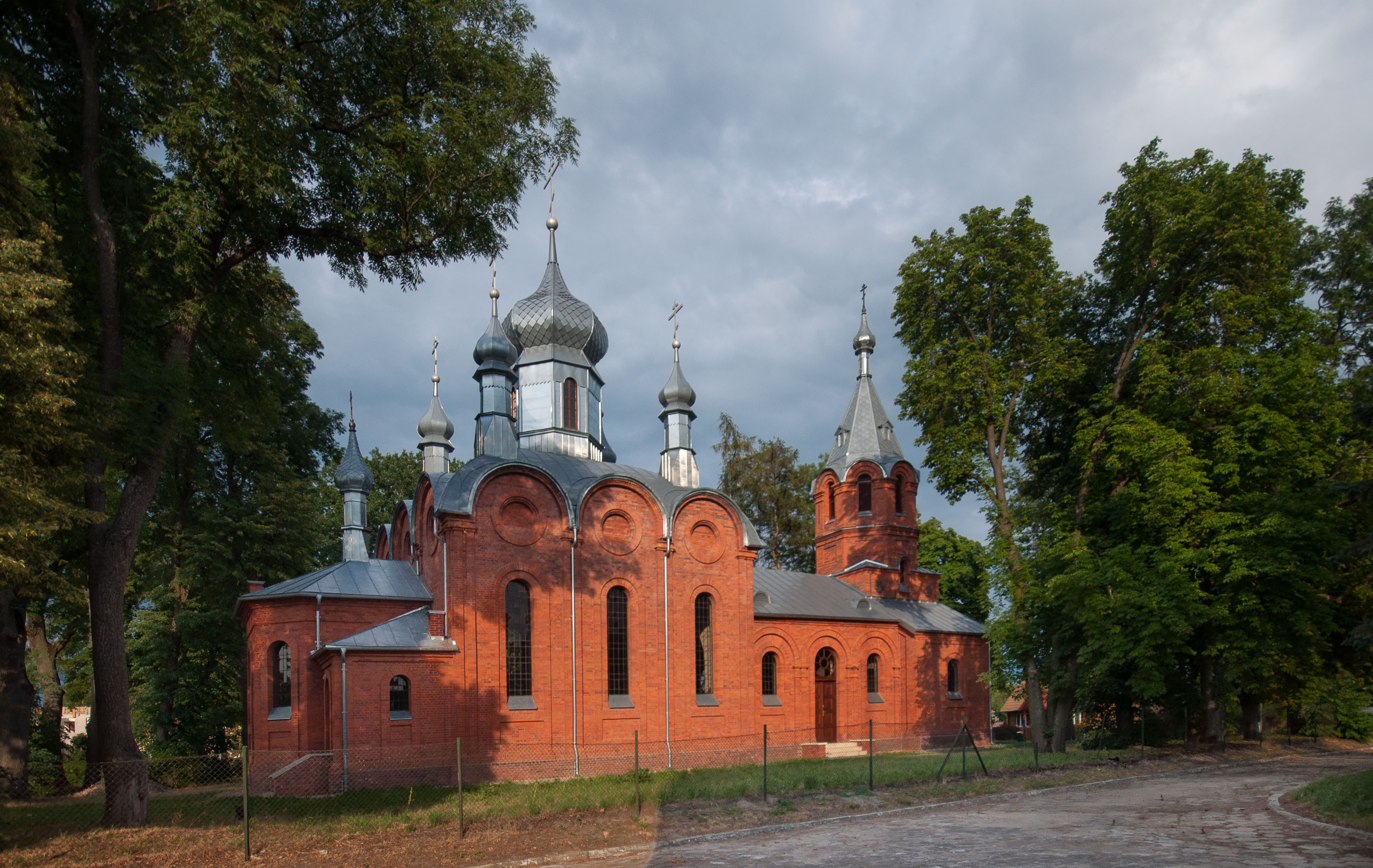
- View of the church from the western side
- Church of the Holy Trinity
- 51°02′49.5″N 23°53′30.6″E
- Location: Dubienka
- Country: Poland
- Denomination: Eastern Orthodoxy
- Churchmanship: Polish Orthodox Church

History
- Status: inactive Orthodox church
- Founder: Kławdij Paschałow
- Dedication: Trinity

Architecture
- Style: Russian Revival
- Completed: 1909
- Closed: 1946

Specifications
- Materials: brick

Administration
- Diocese: Diocese of Lublin and Chełm

The Church of St. Demetrius is an Orthodox church located in Żerczyce, Poland. It serves the parish of the same name, which operates within the Siemiatycze Deanery of the Diocese of Warsaw and Bielsk of the Polish Orthodox Church.

The exact founding date of the parish and the original church in Żerczyce remains undocumented. Local tradition claims its establishment as early as 1001, but the earliest written record of a church dates to 1583. In the 17th century, the church adopted the Union of Brest, becoming Greek Catholic. A new church was constructed in 1662 after the previous structure was destroyed in wartime. Another Greek Catholic church was built between 1726 and 1789.

Following the Synod of Polotsk of 1839, the parish converted to Orthodoxy and joined the Russian Orthodox Diocese of Lithuania (later the Grodno and Volkovysk Eparchy from the early 20th century) of the Russian Orthodox Church. Between 1869 and 1871, a new church was built to serve this Orthodox community, but it was destroyed in a fire in 1944. The current church, a replica of its predecessor, was reconstructed after World War II.

The church is a center of devotion to a venerated copy of the Theotokos of Tikhvin, believed to originate from Vilnius. The original icon was lost in the 1944 fire and replaced with a copy during the post-war rebuilding. The church grounds are enclosed by a stone wall with a main gate featuring a small icon of Christ and a cross. Nearby stand several trees, along with gravestones, votive crosses, and memorials for individuals killed during or after World War II.

== History ==
=== Legendary origins ===
Precisely dating the establishment of the Orthodox parish and the first church in Żerczyce is challenging due to a lack of records, a common issue for Orthodox churches in the region. The earliest documented mention of a church appears in 1583, naming the parson Jakub Kuźmicz. Local oral tradition, unsupported by documents, dates the origins of Eastern Christianity in Żerczyce to 1001, shortly after the Christianization of Kievan Rus'. This view was popularized by the long-serving parish priest Father Eugeniusz Pańko, who cited court records from disputes over parish meadows in 1807 and 1833. These documents record claims by Żerczyce clergy asserting the parish's founding in 1001. The date also appears in 18th-century visitation records when the church was Greek Catholic. If true, the church might initially have been a fortified structure serving Rus' warriors rather than a parish church. Russian church historian Yevgeny Golubinsky considered this hypothesis plausible.

=== Greek Catholic period ===
In 1660, the church in Żerczyce was destroyed by fire during a military conflict. In 1662, Izabela Helena Połubińska funded the construction of a new church, donating two voloks (approximately 33 hectares or 82 acres) of land. This was likely already a Greek Catholic church, as Orthodox parishes in southern Podlachia had adopted the Union of Brest by the mid-17th century, with the exception of the monastery in Drohiczyn. The church and parish suffered significant material losses during the Great Northern War (1700–1721) and a concurrent epidemic, necessitating the construction of another church. A 1726 visitation report describes this new structure as modest – wooden, with a straw roof and a single cross. No earlier furnishings survived. The church housed an iconostasis with two icons in the lower tier, painted royal doors, and four upper-tier icons: two of Christ the Savior, and one each of Saint Stephen and Saint Nicholas. It also featured two side altars with icons of the Annunciation and Saint Demetrius of Thessaloniki, and a main altar with a modest ciborium and an image of Mary.

By 1789, another Greek Catholic church had been built in Żerczyce, also wooden, with a single dome topped by a cross. A 1789 visitation protocol notes a main altar with a carved and painted Marian image, revered by the congregation, as evidenced by votive offerings.

Initially part of the Diocese of Vladimir and Brest, the Greek Catholic parish in Żerczyce joined the Diocese of Surpaśl from 1797 to 1807. During the reorganization of the Greek Catholic Church in the Russian Empire, it was incorporated into the Lithuanian Greek Catholic Diocese along with other churches in the Białystok Land.

In the late 18th and early 19th centuries, the church exhibited strong Latin influences, common among Greek Catholic churches in Podlachia. It lacked many elements typical of Byzantine liturgy until a de-Latinization campaign in the 1830s, led by Bishop Joseph Semashko, prepared it for conversion to Orthodoxy. In the early 1830s, it had no iconostasis or Byzantine-style altar, featuring instead a Latin-style main altar. An iconostasis, altar, and offertory table were reinstalled in 1836, with the iconostasis icons painted by Konstanty Sosnowski in 1837. A pulpit added during the Greek Catholic period was removed by 1838.

In 1837, a tabernacle was acquired, and in February 1839, Church Slavonic editions of the Gospel and Apostle were reintroduced. Latin influence was also evident in the installation of an organ by the 1730s, which was decommissioned in 1835 and dismantled in 1836.

In 1834, during the de-latinization campaign, the church was identified as one of the three wealthiest and most significant in the Drohiczyn Deanery. In 1837, Drohiczyn County Governor Medvedev criticized the diocesan authorities for ineffective delatinization efforts, citing Żerczyce among churches retaining Latin elements. Auxiliary Bishop Anthony Zubko intervened, persuading the Białystok regional governor to restrain Medvedev from interfering in ecclesiastical matters.

By 1838, the church had 898 parishioners. In August 1838, parson Andrzej Żebrowski expressed readiness to convert the parish to the Russian Orthodox Church, despite an unsuccessful plea to Tsar Nicholas I the previous month to retain the Greek Catholic rite. The church officially became Orthodox in 1839 under the Synod of Polotsk, with its congregation growing to 1,026 by 1847.

=== New Orthodox church ===
Between 1869 and 1871, a new Orthodox church was constructed on the site of earlier structures, designed by Leonard Krzyżanowski two years prior. It was dedicated in 1872. Construction was partly funded by selling valuable votive offerings donated in gratitude for miracles attributed to the revered copy of the Theotokos of Tikhvin.

By the late 1890s, the church served 1,875 parishioners, increasing to 2,085 by the early 20th century. Following administrative changes in the Russian Orthodox Church, it joined the Eparchy of Grodno and Volkovysk in the early 1900s.

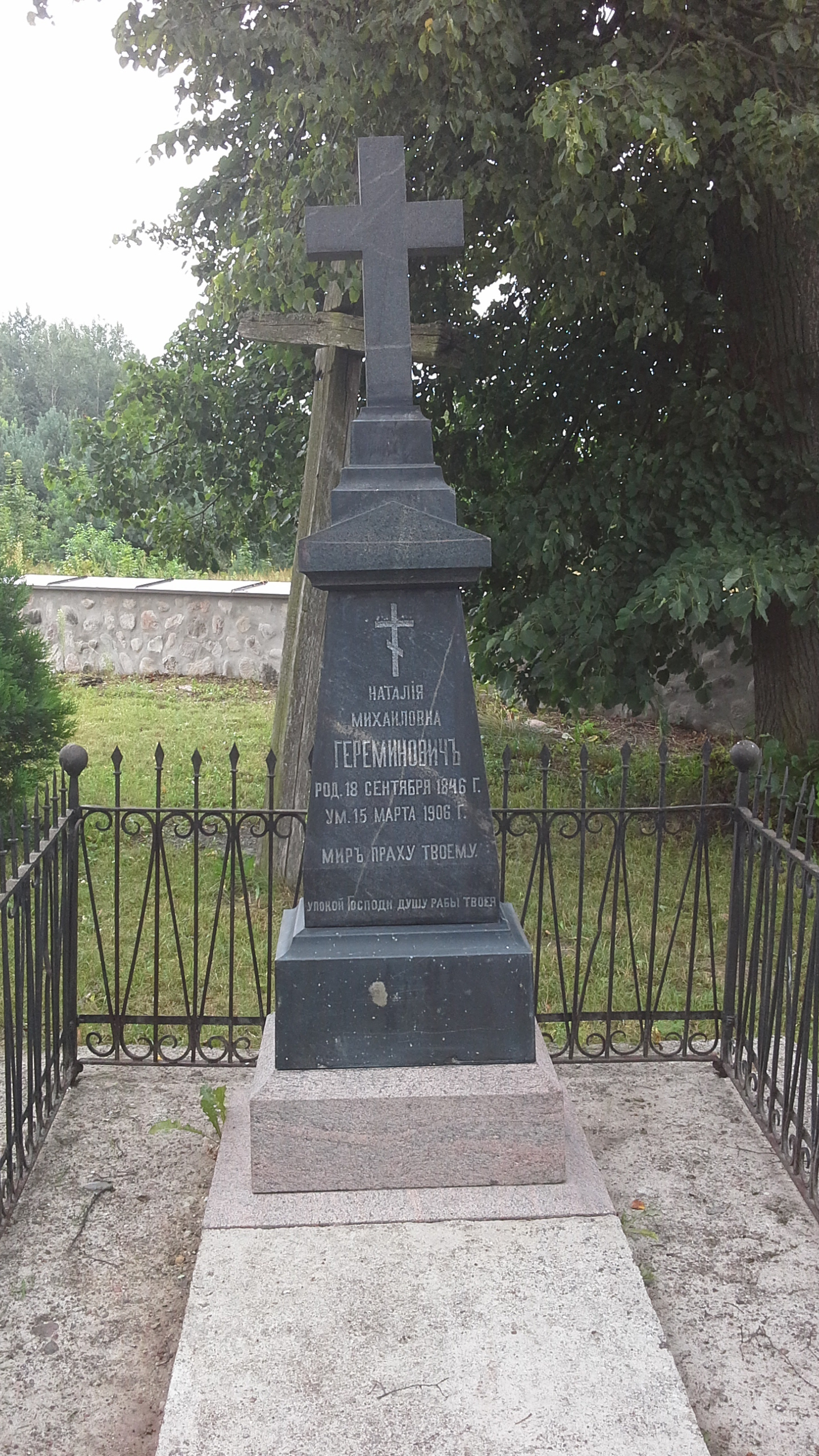
Tombstone from 1906 near the church in Żerczyce

In 1915, the Orthodox residents of Żerczyce fled during the mass exile. Between the world wars, the church functioned as a branch of the St. Barbara Parish in Milejczyce, regaining parish status in 1940.

The church was completely destroyed in a fire on 22 July 1944, when the village was bombed, and rebuilt between 1945 and 1948 through the efforts of Father Eugeniusz Pańko. It was rededicated on 15 November 1951 by Bishop of Białystok and Gdańsk Timothy Szretter. A memorial plaque listing past clergy was installed in the restored church. Post-war congregation size was estimated at 1,331.

In 2001, Metropolitan of Warsaw and all Poland Sawa celebrated the Divine Liturgy in Żerczyce, marking the church's supposed millennial anniversary based on local tradition.

The church was listed in the register of historic monuments on 15 December 2010 under number A-329.

== Architecture ==
=== Structure ===
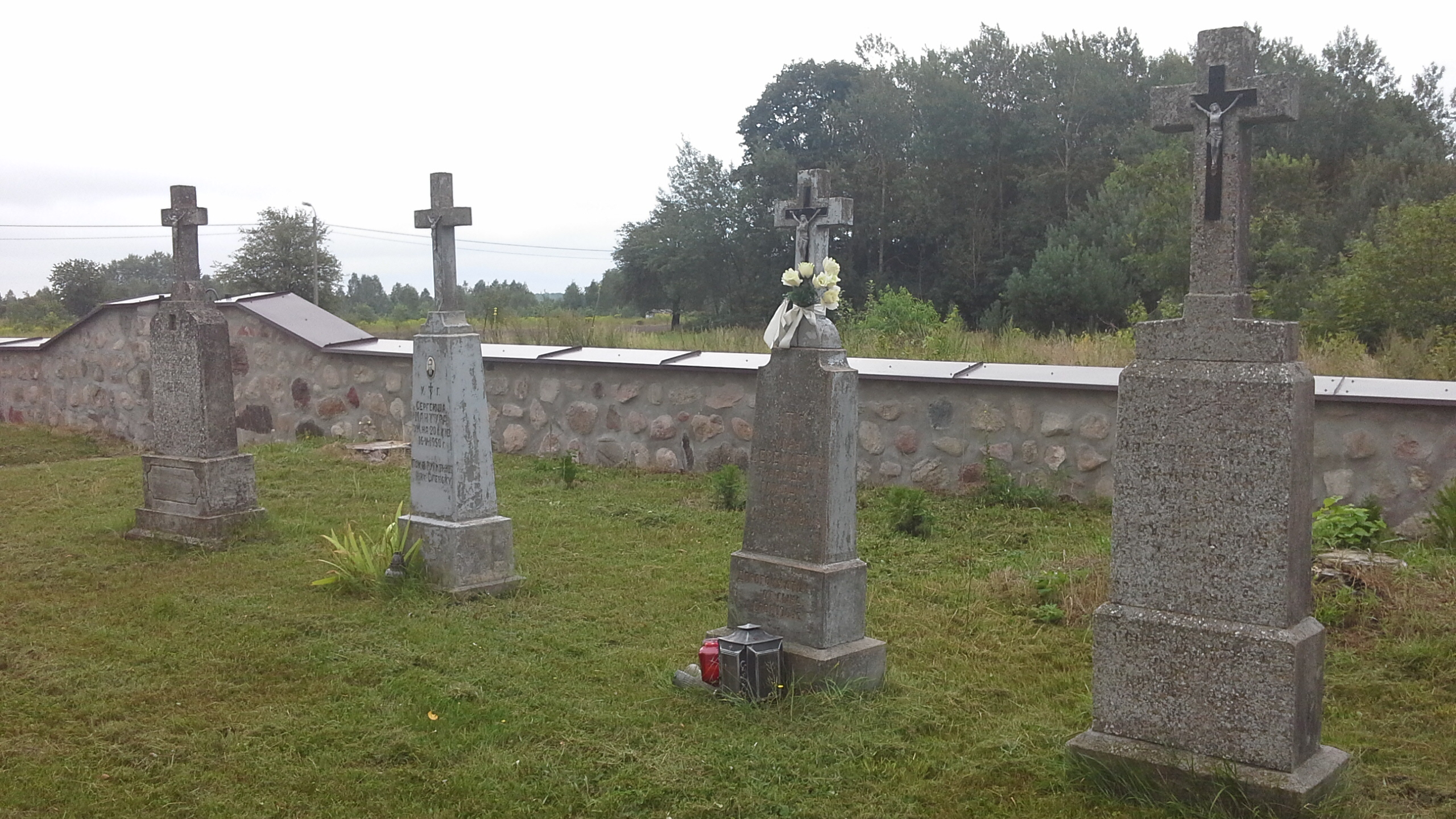
Votive and memorial crosses erected by families in memory of those killed during and after World War II, located on the church grounds

The church in Żerczyce is a stone, plastered, four-part, oriented structure. The church porch is built on a square plan, supporting a quadrangular tower that becomes octagonal in its upper section, topped with a tent roof and a small onion-shaped dome. The main body, also square, adjoins an eastern apse. The facades are crowned with a cornice and reinforced with pilasters at the corners. The church porch has a gable roof, while the nave features a hip roof with an onion dome.

The side walls display framed divisions with a suspended arcaded frieze, and the base of the bell tower features rectangular panels with circular motifs. All windows are semicircular, recessed, with profiled arches.

=== Interior ===
The interior has a wooden ceiling and unpartitioned walls. It contains an iconostasis and two side icon cases with icons, crafted post-reconstruction in the Russian Revival style. The Renaissance Revival icons in the icon cases are also modern. Wall polychromy by Jarosław Wiszenko depicts scenes from the life and martyrdom of the church's patron, Demetrius of Thessaloniki.

=== Theotokos of Tikhvin in Żerczyce ===
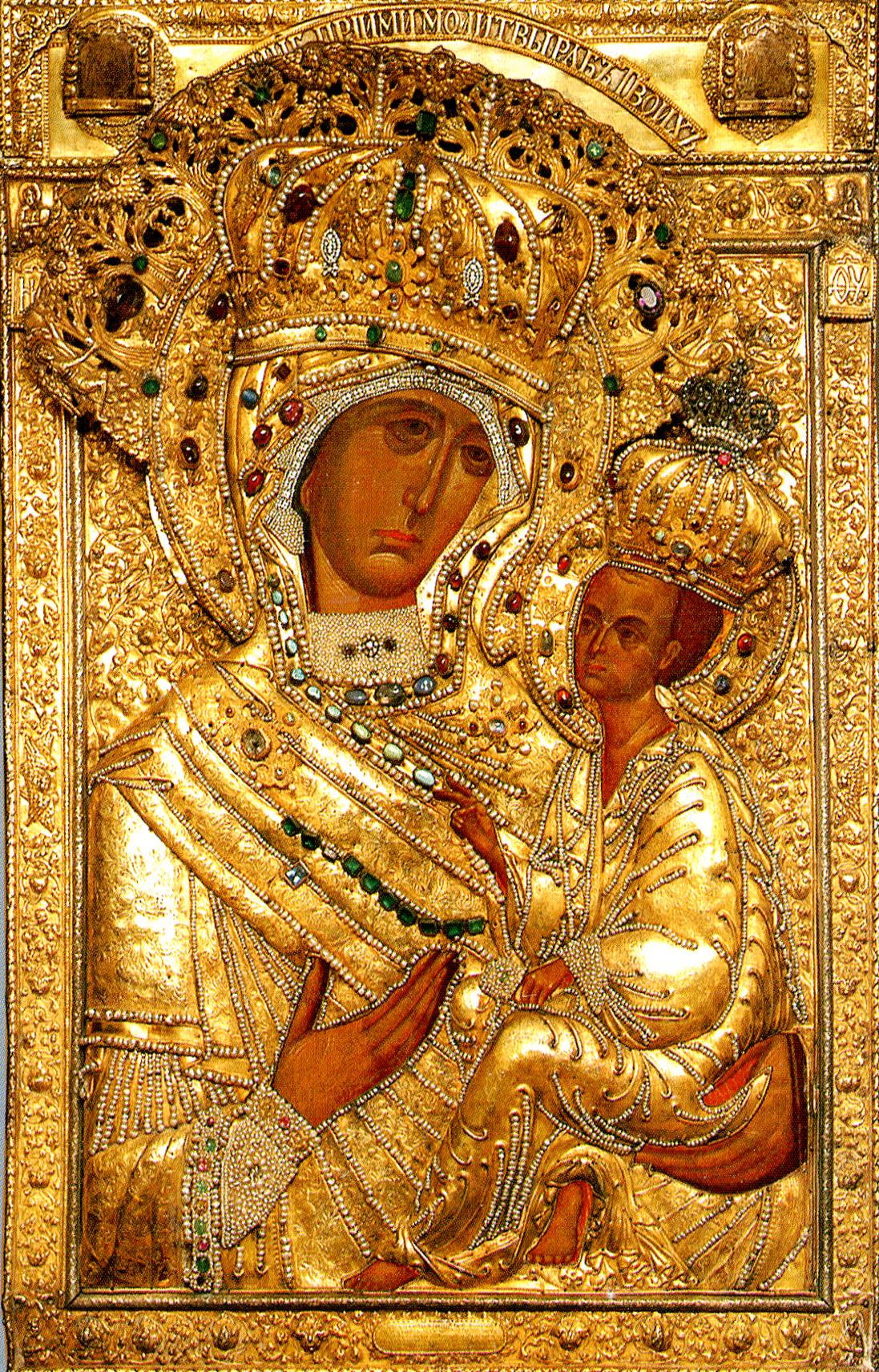
Copy of the Theotokos of Tikhvin in an ornate frame. The Żerczyce icon, destroyed in 1944, was similar in appearance

Local tradition, recorded by Father Eugeniusz Pańko, claims that during the Swedish Deluge, monks from the Holy Spirit Monastery in Vilnius fled to Żerczyce, leaving a copy of the miraculous Theotokos of Tikhvin in the church or a smaller chapel. The icon reportedly performed another miracle: a Swedish soldier who shot at it was blinded, regaining sight only after repenting and vowing to serve the church. If credible, this icon would have been destroyed in the 1660 fire, as the 1726 visitation protocol mentions no such image from the earlier church.

Father Grzegorz Sosna, a historian of Orthodox parishes in Podlachia, suggests the Marian image in the main altar of the late 18th-century Greek Catholic church was also a Tikhvin copy, possibly from Vilnius, tying Pańko's account to an 18th-century event.

The Theotokos of Tikhvin was deeply venerated by both Greek Catholics in the 18th century and Orthodox faithful after 1839, remaining in the church until its destruction in 1944. Only one blurry photograph survives, confirming it as a crowned Hodegetria-type Marian icon in a frame exposing only the faces and hands of Mary and the Child. A 1939 description notes it was housed in a pink wooden icon case, moved there in 1912 from the iconostasis, measuring 124 cm (49 in) high and 78 cm (31 in) wide.

In 1947, a new Tikhvin-inspired icon was installed in the rebuilt church. It depicts Mary standing on a cloud, facing forward, with the Child Jesus on her left arm. She wears a blue robe and a red cloak with gold trim, while Jesus is clad in a blue tunic and orange cloak, blessing with his right hand and holding a scroll in his left. Below, three children appear: a girl in a white dress offering a flower, a kneeling boy praying, and another kneeling girl presenting a bowl. The scene is set against a green landscape with hills and a tree. The icon measures 85 cm (33 in) wide by 130 cm (51 in) high and was conserved in 1991.

== Bibliography ==
- Kołomajska-Saeed, M., ed. (1996). Katalog zabytków sztuki w Polsce. Siemiatycze, Drohiczyn i okolice [Catalogue of Art Monuments in Poland. Siemiatycze, Drohiczyn, and Surroundings] (in Polish). Warsaw: Instytut Sztuki Polskiej Akademii Nauk.
- Sosna, G.; Troc-Sosna, A. (2006). Święte miejsca i cudowne ikony. Prawosławne sanktuaria na Białostocczyźnie [Holy Places and Miraculous Icons. Orthodox Sanctuaries in the Białystok Land] (in Polish). Białystok: Orthdruk. ISBN 83-85368-69-8.
- Matus, I. (2013). Schyłek unii i proces restytucji prawosławia w obwodzie białostockim w latach 30. XIX wieku [The Decline of the Union and the Process of Restoring Orthodoxy in the Białystok Land in the 1830s]. Białystok: Wydawnictwo Uniwersytetu w Białymstoku. ISBN 978-83-7431-364-3.
