= Siemichocze =

- Village
- Location within Poland
- Coordinates: 52°26′N 23°12′E
- Country: Poland
- Voivodeship: Podlaskie
- County: Siemiatycze
- Gmina: Nurzec-Stacja
- Time zone: UTC+1 (CET)
  - Summer (DST): UTC+2 (CEST)

Siemichocze [ɕɛmiˈxɔt͡ʂɛ] is a village in the administrative district of Gmina Nurzec-Stacja, within Siemiatycze County, Podlaskie Voivodeship, in eastern Poland, close to the border with Belarus.

== History ==
Three Polish citizens were murdered by Nazi Germany in the village during World War II.
