= Augustynka =

- Village
- Location within Poland
- Coordinates: 52°27′N 23°9′E
- Country: Poland
- Voivodeship: Podlaskie
- County: Siemiatycze
- Gmina: Nurzec-Stacja

Augustynka [auɡusˈtɨŋka] is a village in the administrative district of Gmina Nurzec-Stacja, within Siemiatycze County, Podlaskie Voivodeship, in north-eastern Poland, close to the border with Belarus.
