= Dąbrowa Leśna, Podlaskie Voivodeship =

Village in Gmina Nurzec-Stacja, Poland

Dąbrowa Leśna
- Village
- Location within Poland
- Coordinates: 52°26′02″N 23°07′58″E
- Country: Poland
- Voivodeship: Podlaskie
- County: Siemiatycze
- Gmina: Nurzec-Stacja

Dąbrowa Leśna [dɔmˈbrɔva ˈlɛɕna] is a village in the administrative district of Gmina Nurzec-Stacja, within Siemiatycze County, Podlaskie Voivodeship, in north-eastern Poland, close to the border with Belarus.
