= Sokóle, Podlaskie Voivodeship =

Village in Gmina Nurzec-Stacja, Poland

Sokóle
- Village
- Location within Poland
- Coordinates: 52°25′10″N 23°02′22″E
- Country: Poland
- Voivodeship: Podlaskie
- County: Siemiatycze
- Gmina: Nurzec-Stacja
- Time zone: UTC+1 (CET)
  - Summer (DST): UTC+2 (CEST)

Sokóle [sɔˈkulɛ] is a village in the administrative district of Gmina Nurzec-Stacja, within Siemiatycze County, Podlaskie Voivodeship, in eastern Poland, close to the border with Belarus.
