= Meyer Abovitz =

Rabbi and Rosh Yeshiva active

Meyer Abovitz (מאיר בן ישעיהו אבוביץ; alternate spelling Meir Abowitz; 1876–1941) was a Rabbi and Rosh Yeshiva active in Mizrachi in Eastern Europe between the Two World Wars.

== Biography ==
Rabbi Abovitz studied in Slabodka, Kovno and Radin, and received Semicha (ordination) from Rabbis Moshe Danishevsky, Hirsh Rabinovich, and Malkiel Tannenbaum, respectively holding the positions of Av Beit Din in Slabodka, Kovno and Lomza. He was married to Chana née Malach; their daughter Feige Rachel ("Fanny") later married Rabbi Simcha Wasserman.

He was Av Beit Din and Rav in Telatycze, White Russia and then Lubiezh (Lubcza, modern Lubcha). The latter was destroyed during the early days of the First World War, and he then relocated to German held Navahrudak, where he headed the Bet Yosef Yeshiva; see Novardok Yeshiva. The Rav there was Meyer Meyerovitz.

Rabbi Abovitz participated in the founding assembly of Mizrachi of Lithuania and Poland, in Vilna, 1919; he was involved in various committees of the movement in Poland between the two World Wars. See Mizrachi in Poland. He was also active in "religious national education" which he saw a counterweight to the Jewish secular schools founded in Navahrudak following the First World War. Despite his involvement with Mizrachi he was also accepted by the Agudath Yisrael.

Navahrudak was occupied by Nazi Germany in July 1941, and Rabbi Abovitz was murdered by the Nazis with the rest of the Jewish population; see Novogrudok § World War II.

== Works ==
He authored the following works:

- Zichron Yeshayahu - derushim
- Kochvei Ohr - explanations of the Aggadah
- Pnei Meir - on the Jerusalem Talmud
- Pnei Meir - on the Weekly Torah portion

== External links and references ==
- אנציקלופדיה של הציונות הדתית, א, עמ 2–1; ספר הציונות הדתית, ב, עמ 499
