= Anusin, Gmina Nurzec-Stacja =

Anusin
- Village
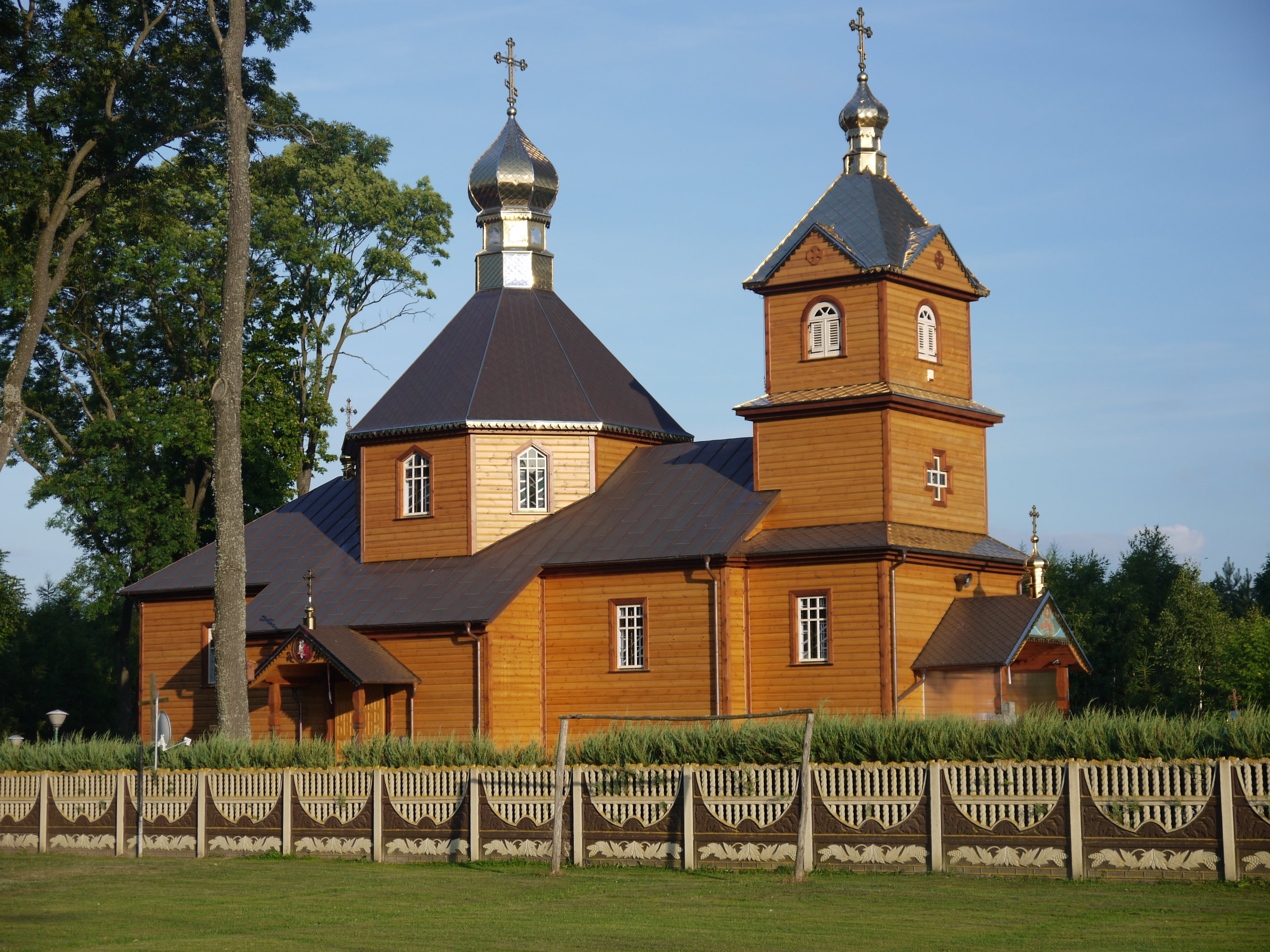

- Location within Poland
- Coordinates: 52°24′49″N 23°10′55″E
- Country: Poland
- Voivodeship: Podlaskie
- County: Siemiatycze
- Gmina: Nurzec-Stacja

Anusin [aˈnuɕin] is a village in the administrative district of Gmina Nurzec-Stacja, within Siemiatycze County, Podlaskie Voivodeship, in north-eastern Poland, close to the border with Belarus.
