= Borysowszczyzna =

- Village
- Location within Poland
- Coordinates: 52°26′N 23°6′E
- Country: Poland
- Voivodeship: Podlaskie
- County: Siemiatycze
- Gmina: Nurzec-Stacja

Borysowszczyzna [bɔrɨsɔfʂˈt͡ʂɨzna] is a village in the administrative district of Gmina Nurzec-Stacja, within Siemiatycze County, Podlaskie Voivodeship, in north-eastern Poland, close to the border with Belarus.

According to the 1921 census, the village was inhabited by 135 people, among whom 17 were Roman Catholic, 102 Orthodox, and 16 Mosaic. At the same time, 85 inhabitants declared Polish nationality, 35 Belarusian and 15 Jewish. There were 18 residential buildings in the village.
