= Zabłocie, Podlaskie Voivodeship =

Zabłocie
- Village
- Location within Poland
- Coordinates: 52°30′N 23°3′E
- Country: Poland
- Voivodeship: Podlaskie
- County: Siemiatycze
- Gmina: Nurzec-Stacja

Zabłocie [zaˈbwɔt͡ɕɛ] is a village in the administrative district of Gmina Nurzec-Stacja, within Siemiatycze County, Podlaskie Voivodeship, in north-eastern Poland, close to the border with Belarus.

According to the 1921 census, the village was inhabited by 267 people, among whom 105 were Roman Catholic, 152 Orthodox, and 10 Mosaic. At the same time, 194 inhabitants declared Polish nationality, 71 Belarusian, 1 Jewish and 1 another. There were 46 residential buildings in the village.
