= Tymianka, Podlaskie Voivodeship =

Tymianka
- Village
- Location within Poland
- Coordinates: 52°26′8″N 23°13′0″E
- Country: Poland
- Voivodeship: Podlaskie
- County: Siemiatycze
- Gmina: Nurzec-Stacja
- Population: 280

Tymianka [tɨˈmjaŋka] is a village in the administrative district of Gmina Nurzec-Stacja, within Siemiatycze County, Podlaskie Voivodeship, in north-eastern Poland, close to the border with Belarus.
