= Grabarka-Klasztor =

- Settlement
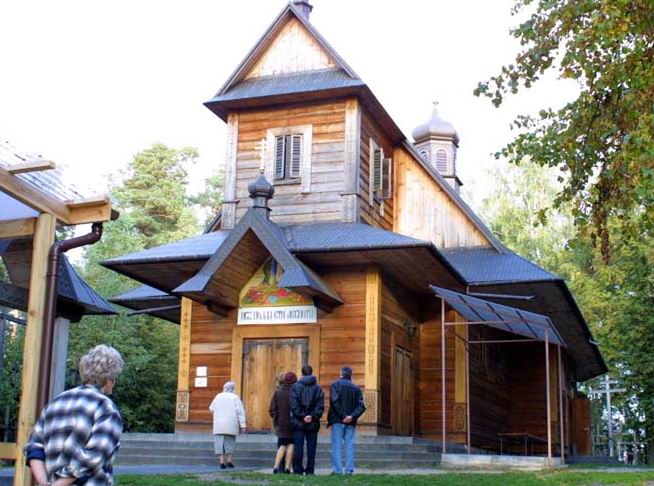
- Exterior of the Transfiguration of Jesus Christ Church in Grabarka

- Location within Poland
- Coordinates: 52°25′00″N 23°00′21″E
- Country: Poland
- Voivodeship: Podlaskie
- County: Siemiatycze
- Gmina: Nurzec-Stacja

Grabarka-Klasztor [ɡraˈbarka ˈklaʂtɔr] is a settlement in the administrative district of Gmina Nurzec-Stacja, within Siemiatycze County, Podlaskie Voivodeship, in north-eastern Poland, close to the border with Belarus. The settlement is the location of the Grabarka Holy Mount.
