= Żerczyce =

- Village
- Location within Poland
- Coordinates: 52°29′N 23°5′E
- Country: Poland
- Voivodeship: Podlaskie
- County: Siemiatycze
- Gmina: Nurzec-Stacja

Żerczyce [ʐɛrˈt͡ʂɨt͡sɛ] is a village in the administrative district of Gmina Nurzec-Stacja, within Siemiatycze County, Podlaskie Voivodeship, in north-eastern Poland, close to the border with Belarus.

According to the 1921 census, the village was inhabited by 271 people, among whom 19 were Roman Catholic, 248 Orthodox, and 4 Mosaic. At the same time, 27 inhabitants declared Polish nationality, 240 Belarusian and 4 Jewish. There were 51 residential buildings in the village.

There is an Orthodox Church of St. Demetrius in the village. The church is a center of devotion to a venerated copy of the Theotokos of Tikhvin, believed to originate from Vilnius. The original icon was lost in the 1944 fire and replaced with a copy during the post-war rebuilding. The church grounds are enclosed by a stone wall with a main gate featuring a small icon of Christ and a cross. Nearby stand several trees, along with gravestones, votive crosses, and memorials for individuals killed during or after World War II.
