= Nurczyk-Kolonia =

- Village
- Location within Poland
- Coordinates: 52°28′29″N 23°08′01″E
- Country: Poland
- Voivodeship: Podlaskie
- County: Siemiatycze
- Gmina: Nurzec-Stacja

Nurczyk-Kolonia [ˈnurt͡ʂɨk kɔˈlɔɲa] is a village in the administrative district of Gmina Nurzec-Stacja, within Siemiatycze County, Podlaskie Voivodeship, in north-eastern Poland, close to the border with Belarus.
