= Chanie =

- Village
- Location within Poland
- Coordinates: 52°29′N 23°8′E
- Country: Poland
- Voivodeship: Podlaskie
- County: Siemiatycze
- Gmina: Nurzec-Stacja

Chanie [ˈxaɲɛ] is a village in the administrative district of Gmina Nurzec-Stacja, within Siemiatycze County, Podlaskie Voivodeship, in north-eastern Poland, close to the border with Belarus.

According to the 1921 census, the village was inhabited by 818 people, among whom 2 were Roman Catholic, 726 Orthodox, and 7 Mosaic. At the same time, 4 inhabitants declared Polish nationality, 77 Belarusian. There were 17 residential buildings in the village.
