= Zalesie, Gmina Nurzec-Stacja =

Zalesie
- Village
- Location within Poland
- Coordinates: 52°28′2″N 23°3′1″E
- Country: Poland
- Voivodeship: Podlaskie
- County: Siemiatycze
- Gmina: Nurzec-Stacja
- Postal code: 17-330

Zalesie [zaˈlɛɕɛ] is a village in the administrative district of Gmina Nurzec-Stacja, within Siemiatycze County, Podlaskie Voivodeship, in eastern Poland, close to the border with Belarus.
