= Gmina Nurzec-Stacja =

Gmina Nurzec-Stacja Nurzec-Stacja Commune
- Gmina
- Interactive map of Gmina Nurzec-Stacja
- Coordinates (Nurzec-Stacja): 52°27′47″N 23°5′14″E
- Country: Poland
- Voivodeship: Podlaskie
- County: Siemiatycze
- Seat: Nurzec-Stacja

Area
  - Total: 214.96 km^{2} (83.00 sq mi)

Population (2006)
  - Total: 4,460
  - Density: 20.7/km^{2} (53.7/sq mi)

Gmina Nurzec-Stacja is a rural gmina (administrative district) in Siemiatycze County, Podlaskie Voivodeship, in north-eastern Poland, on the border with Belarus. Its seat is the village of Nurzec-Stacja, which lies approximately 16 kilometres (10 mi) east of Siemiatycze and 73 km (45 mi) south of the regional capital Białystok.

The gmina covers an area of 214.96 square kilometres (83.0 sq mi), and as of 2006 its total population is 4,460.

== Villages ==
Gmina Nurzec-Stacja contains the villages and settlements of Anusin, Augustynka, Borysowszczyzna, Chanie, Chursy, Dąbrowa Leśna, Gajówka, Grabarka, Grabarka-Klasztor, Klukowicze, Klukowicze-Kolonia, Litwinowicze, Moszczona Pańska, Nurczyk, Nurczyk-Kolonia, Nurzec, Nurzec-Kisielewo, Nurzec-Kolonia, Nurzec-Stacja, Piszczatka, Siemichocze, Sokóle, Stołbce, Sycze, Szumiłówka, Tartak, Telatycze, Tymianka, Wakułowicze, Werpol, Wólka Nurzecka, Wyczółki, Zabłocie, Zalesie and Żerczyce.

== Neighbouring gminas ==
Gmina Nurzec-Stacja is bordered by the gminas of Czeremcha, Mielnik, Milejczyce and Siemiatycze. It also borders Belarus.
