= Nurzec, Siemiatycze County =

Nurzec
- Village
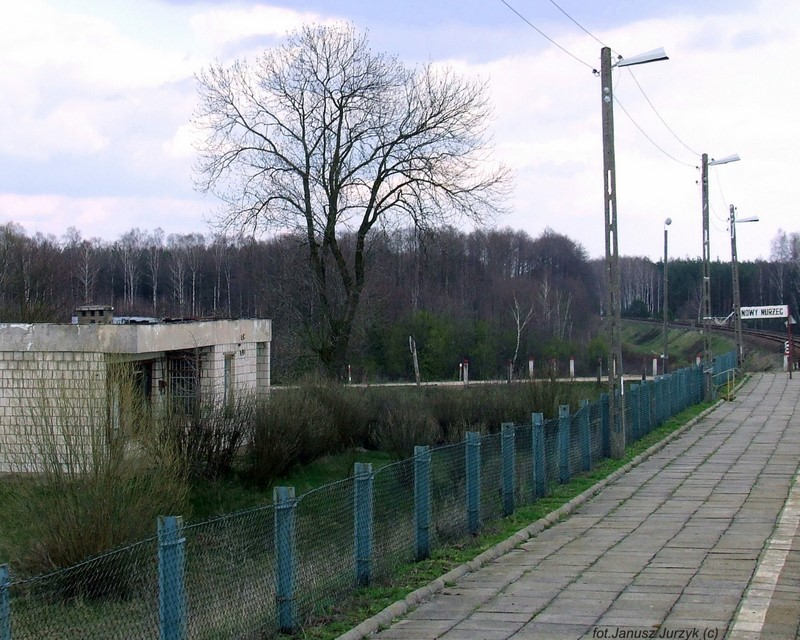
- Railway station in Nurzec

- Location within Poland
- Coordinates: 52°48′21″N 23°17′30″E
- Country: Poland
- Voivodeship: Podlaskie
- County: Siemiatycze
- Gmina: Nurzec-Stacja

Nurzec [ˈnuʐɛt͡s] is a village in the administrative district of Gmina Nurzec-Stacja, within Siemiatycze County, Podlaskie Voivodeship, in north-eastern Poland, close to the border with Belarus.
