= Mongol invasion of Poland =

Mongol invasion of Poland may refer to:

- First Mongol invasion of Poland, 1240–1241
- Second Mongol invasion of Poland, 1259–1260
- Third Mongol invasion of Poland, 1287–1288

== See also ==
- Galicia–Volhynia Wars, 1340–1341
