= Nurzec-Stacja =

- Village
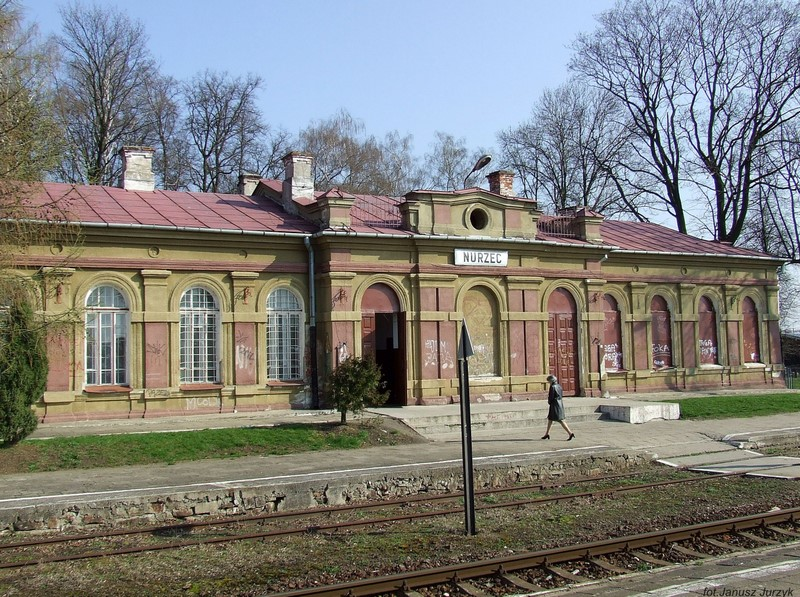

- Location within Poland
- Coordinates: 52°27′47″N 23°5′14″E
- Country: Poland
- Voivodeship: Podlaskie
- County: Siemiatycze
- Gmina: Nurzec-Stacja
- Population: 2,000

Nurzec-Stacja ([ˈnuʐɛt͡s ˈstat͡sja]; Belarusian: Нурэц-Станцыя, Nurec-Stancyja; Podlachian: Nuréć-Stácija) is a village in Siemiatycze County, Podlaskie Voivodeship, in north-eastern Poland, close to the border with Belarus. It is the seat of the gmina (administrative district) called Gmina Nurzec-Stacja.

According to the 1921 census, the village was inhabited by 156 people, among whom 81 were Roman Catholic, 30 Orthodox, 7 Evangelical and 38 Mosaic. At the same time, 91 inhabitants declared Polish nationality, 26 Belarusian, 1 German and 38 Jewish. There were 16 residential buildings in the village.

The village serves as a local transportation hub due to its railway station connecting to major cities.
