= Wyczółki, Podlaskie Voivodeship =

Wyczółki
- Village
- Location within Poland
- Coordinates: 52°25′N 23°18′E
- Country: Poland
- Voivodeship: Podlaskie
- County: Siemiatycze
- Gmina: Nurzec-Stacja

Wyczółki [vɨˈt͡ʂuu̯ki] is a village in the administrative district of Gmina Nurzec-Stacja, within Siemiatycze County, Podlaskie Voivodeship, in north-eastern Poland, close to the border with Belarus.
