= Bujaki =

Bujaki may refer to:

- Bujaki, Podlaskie Voivodeship, a village in Poland
- Bujaki, Warmian-Masurian Voivodeship, a village in Poland
- Bujáki, Hungarian surname
