= Church of Saints Cosmas and Damian, Narojki =

Orthodox church in Narojki, Poland

Church of Saints Cosmas and Damian
- Cerkiew Świętych Kosmy i Damiana
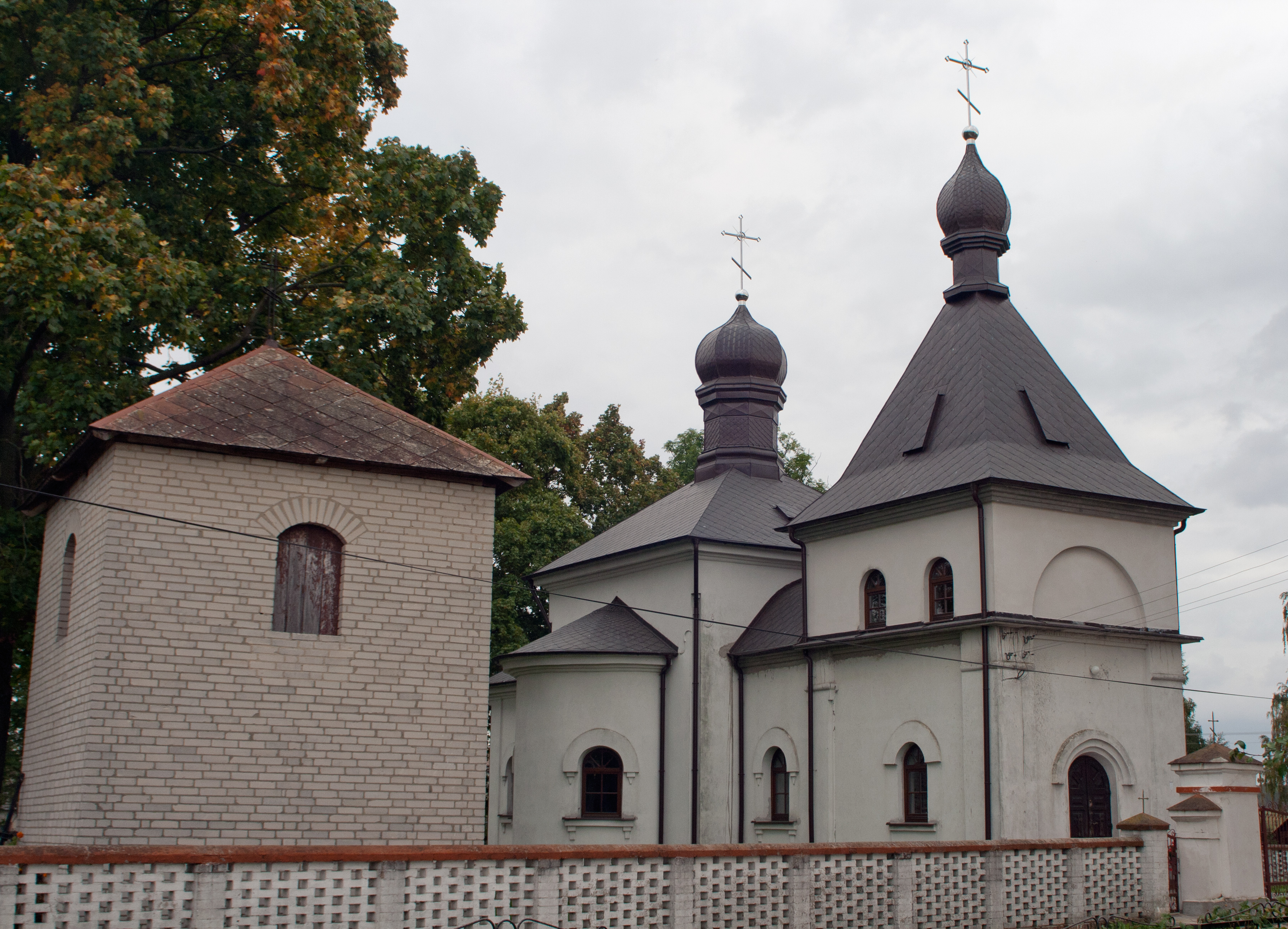
- General view
- Church of Saints Cosmas and Damian
- 52°28′26.6″N 22°42′35.1″E
- Location: Narojki; Poland
- Denomination: Eastern Orthodoxy
- Churchmanship: Polish Orthodox Church

History
- Status: Active Orthodox church
- Founder(s): Russian State Treasury and local parishioners
- Dedication: Cosmas and Damian
- Dedicated: 1866

Architecture
- Completed: 1866

Specifications
- Materials: brick, stone

Administration
- Diocese: Diocese of Warsaw and Bielsk

Church of Saints Cosmas and Damian is an Orthodox church in Narojki. It belongs to the parish of the same dedication, which is part of the Siemiatycze Deanery of the Diocese of Warsaw and Bielsk of the Polish Orthodox Church.

The oldest mention of a church in Narojki dates back to 1629. The inventory of its furnishings from that year does not clarify whether the building was under Orthodox or Uniate (Eastern Catholic) clergy, though the former is more likely. The church in Narojki effectively became a Uniate temple in the mid-17th century, like most other Orthodox sacred sites in the region. The oldest church in Narojki remained in existence until 1738 when a new one was built in its place. Both were wooden structures. In 1789, the church underwent partial renovation and expansion. Since the first half of the 18th century, the parish in Narojki has been a center of veneration for the Galac Icon of the Mother of God.

The construction of a brick Orthodox church in Narojki took place between 1865 and 1866, with most of the funds provided by the Russian state. Since then, the church has remained continuously active, except for the years between 1915 and 1918.

The church is located in the center of the village, along the road to Sady, on a plot surrounded by a contemporary brick fence with a gate featuring Orthodox crosses. Within the church grounds, there are a few trees and several tombstones.

The building, along with the church cemetery, is listed in the register of historic monuments under number A-29.

== History ==
=== First Orthodox church in Narojki ===
The first record of a church in Narojki dates back to 1629 and is an inventory of the temple's property. Although the building was located within the Uniate Eparchy of Volodymyr–Brest, which had been part of the Uniate Church since its inception, it was most likely originally built as an Orthodox church and, at the time of the inventory, effectively remained under that denomination. The Union was only permanently accepted in the region in the mid-17th century.

Another description of the church comes from 1726 and is part of a canonical visitation protocol conducted by Uniate clergy in the Drohiczyn Deanery. The description states that the church was very old and dilapidated, lacking a church porch and a bell tower, with a rotting roof. It also noted the presence of an iconostasis featuring icons of Christ the Savior, the Mother of God, Saint Nicholas, Saint Elijah, and Saint Anthony.

=== 1738 church ===
A visitation protocol from 1757 stated that a new church had been built in 1738 to replace the older one. It was funded by the Skiwski family. The patronal icon of Saints Cosmas and Damian was transferred to the new building, which also housed an altar with a Marian image. This altar had been donated to the church by the local Roman Catholic parish at the request of the Uniate priest. The Uniate parish was poor, and its priest had to make special efforts to secure any financial assistance from patrons. From the first half of the 18th century, a copy of the Galac Icon of the Mother of God became a significant object of veneration in the church. Before 1789, the church underwent renovations funded by Karol Urbański, the Podlachian cupbearer, who paid for the construction of a new church porch and a bell tower above it. The church contained two side altars, one with the patronal icon and the other with the Galac Icon of the Mother of God.

Until 1797, the parish in Narojki remained within the structures of the Uniate Eparchy of Volodymyr–Brest. From 1797 to 1807, it belonged to the Drohiczyn Deanery of the Uniate Diocese of Supraśl. After the latter's dissolution, it was incorporated into the Uniate Diocese of Vilnius, remaining in the Drohiczyn Deanery.

At the beginning of the 19th century, 522 people attended the church. Until the abolition of the Union in Podlachia, cases of switching from the Uniate to the Latin rite were common in Narojki, influenced by the activities of the Piarist monastery in Drohiczyn. In 1834, the church was classified as one of the poorest in the Vilnius Diocese.

The furnishings of the Uniate church in Narojki during the 18th and 19th centuries were heavily Latinized, reflecting contemporary trends in the Uniate Church in line with the directives of the Synod of Zamość of 1720. In the 1830s, the consistory of the Uniate Metropolitanate of Vilnius, led by Bishop Joseph Semashko, began efforts to change this, preparing for the conversion of the entire administration to Orthodoxy. In 1836, a new iconostasis (without icons), a prothesis table, and an altar were installed. Work on equipping the church was delayed because local landowners refused to provide financial support or purchase typically Orthodox liturgical items. Ultimately, no new icons were placed in the church's iconostasis; instead, the existing structure was filled with old paintings. A year later, a new tabernacle was installed, and the Uniate pulpit was removed. However, the church never had a pipe organ.

Like other Uniate churches near Drohiczyn that were situated on private estates, the church in Narojki experienced the slowest and most challenging process of de-Latinization. The parish remained under the missionary influence of the Piarist monastery in Drohiczyn, which increased the popularity of the Latin rite. In March 1838, District Head Medvedev accused the Drohiczyn dean of allowing typically Latin liturgical items to be kept in the church (as well as in other churches of the deanery). At the same time, in December 1837, the parson of Narojki declared his willingness to convert to Orthodoxy.

The church in Narojki was transferred to the Russian Orthodox Church in February 1839 under the provisions of the Synod of Polotsk. It was then incorporated into the Diocese of Lithuania. Only at this point were Church Slavonic liturgical books – the Gospel Book and the Apostolos – introduced to the church. However, by then, it was no longer a parish church. In January of that year, the local landowner, Onufry Pieńkowski (Pańkowski), informed Bishop Antoni Zubko that he would not be able to finance the construction of a new church. Since Narojki was located close to Drohiczyn and the Church of Saint Nicholas there, the approximately 500 parishioners of Narojki were ordered to attend services in Drohiczyn, and the separate parish in the village was dissolved. This process was completed in May 1839 when the parish priest of Narojki was transferred to the parish in Rajsk. The church in Drohiczyn also received the liturgical utensils from the church in Narojki.

=== Brick church ===
In 1863, parishioners initiated the construction of a brick church to replace the abandoned wooden structure, gathering 152 rubles for the project. The Russian state contributed 1,500 rubles. The new church was built near the old one, which remained in use until construction was completed and was then dismantled (or possibly destroyed by fire). The construction lasted from 1865 to 1866, and the church was consecrated on 8 November 1866. A wooden bell tower stood adjacent to the new building.

The Galac Icon of the Mother of God remained an object of special veneration. 19th-century sources mention a local tradition claiming that the icon had miraculously appeared to the residents of Narojki by manifesting itself on a tree. During the construction of the new church, the icon was initially kept in the barn of a local farmer and later transferred to the Church of the Acheiropoietos in Rogawka. After the completion of the brick church, the image was ceremoniously returned to its original place of worship and placed in a newly gilded cover.

In 1900, the parish in Narojki became part of the newly established Eparchy of Grodno and Vawkavysk.

A fire broke out in the church in 1908, but it caused no significant damage. The local parish collapsed in 1915 when the population fled eastward during the mass exile. After World War I, the government refused to restore the church's parish status, allowing it only to function as a filial church of the Siemiatycze parish within the Diocese of Warsaw and Chełm. The church building, though abandoned during the war, remained intact. The miraculous icon was taken by the faithful to Russia, but after their return, it was placed back in the church. In 1929, the Roman Catholic Church sought legal revindication of the church in Narojki, arguing that it stood on the site of a former Uniate place of worship. However, the court dismissed the claim.

Between 1941 and the end of World War II, icons from the church in Drohiczyn were stored in the Narojki church. Local parishioners had taken them out of the town to protect them from destruction or confiscation by Soviet troops. The church itself remained undamaged throughout the war. However, after the conflict, the number of worshippers declined significantly due to the emigration of Orthodox (Belarusian) residents to the Soviet Union and migration to urban areas.

In the 1960s, the entire church complex underwent renovations. A new bell tower replaced the deteriorated wooden one, and a new fence was erected around the churchyard. In 1975, the wooden church porch was demolished and replaced with a brick structure that included an internal choir loft. At the end of the 20th century, the church's roof was covered with zinc sheets. After World War II, the parish in Narojki became part of the Diocese of Warsaw and Bielsk.

== Architecture ==
=== Structure of the building ===
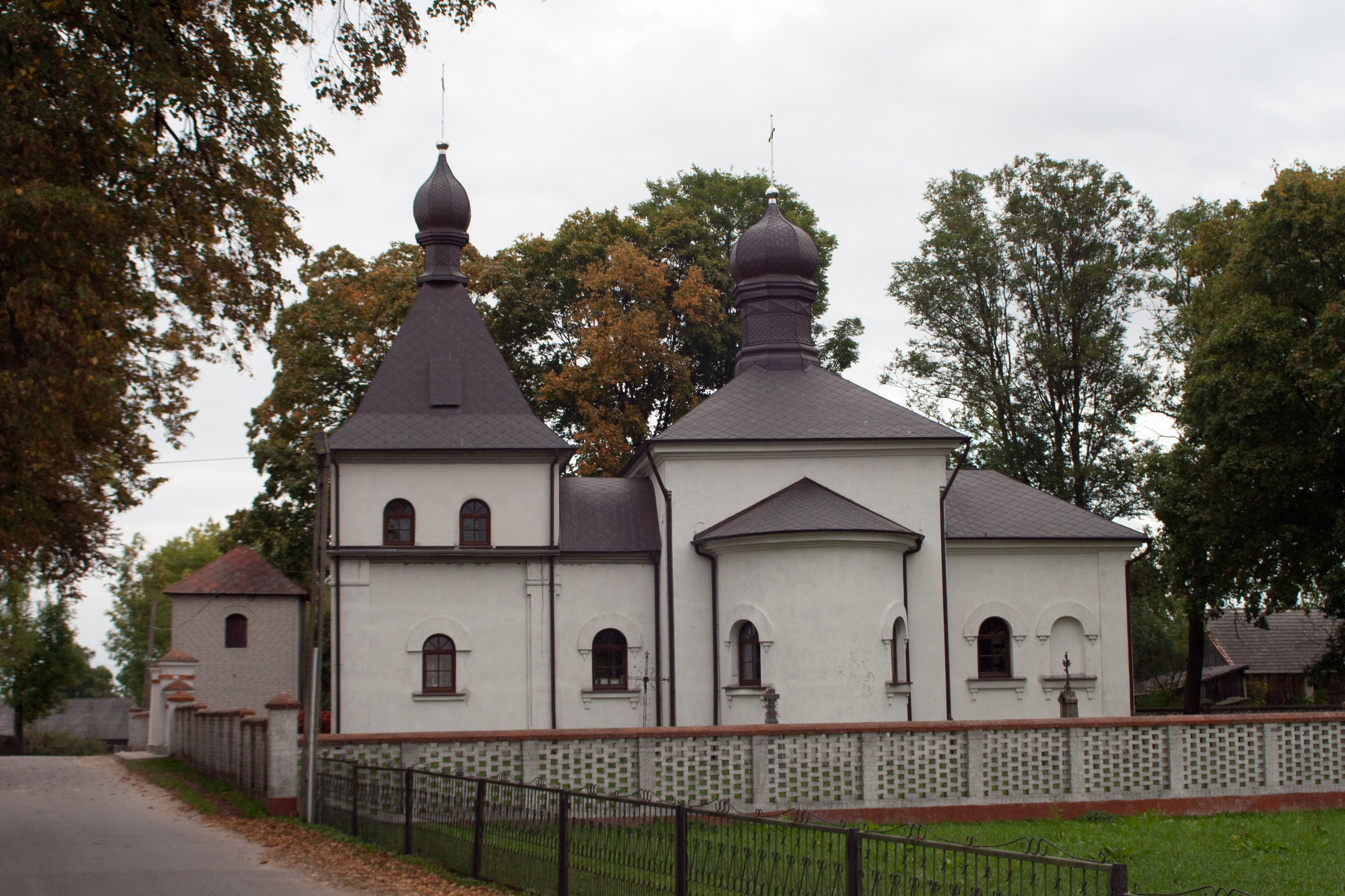
Church from the southern side

The church in Narojki is a stone, masonry, and orientated structure with a three-part layout. The single nave was built on a rectangular plan close to a square, with apse-like annexes on the north and south sides. Both the chancel and the church porch are lower and narrower than the nave. The church porch and annexes open into the nave through semicircular arcades. All windows are rectangular with rounded tops, as is the main door. Above the windows, decorative plaster archivolts rest on cuboid corbels. While the nave's facades are unadorned, the walls of the altar and church porch feature pseudo-pilasters. The church's roofs are covered with metal sheeting. The nave is topped with a hip roof crowned by a low turret with an onion dome. The annexes have tented roofs, while the church porch and chancel are covered with gable roofs.

=== Interior ===
The nave is covered by a four-field vault, while the chancel and the older part of the church porch have barrel vaulting. The newer section, built in the 20th century, has a flat ceiling. In addition to the highly venerated copy of the Galac Icon of the Mother of God, the church houses another icon from the Uniate period: The Exaltation of the Holy Cross, painted in 1780 by a folk artist. From the mid-19th century comes a processional banner featuring images of the Mother of God with Child and the Holy Trinity. A slightly later tabernacle, dating to the third quarter of the 19th century, is adorned with figures of angels and Saints Peter and Paul. The four-sided base of this tabernacle features enamel plaques depicting the Last Supper, Christ's Agony in the Garden, Christ Carrying the Cross, and the Entombment. The tabernacle is crowned with a figure of the Resurrected Christ.

=== Galac Icon of the Mother of God from Narojki ===
Since the first half of the 18th century, the church in Narojki has been a center of veneration for a Marian icon, considered in Orthodox tradition to be a copy of the Galac Icon of the Mother of God. Conservation descriptions link this image to the depiction found in the Santa Maria Maggiore in Rome.

The icon, painted in the first half of the 17th century, measures 113 × 83 cm, with a frame 13 cm wide. The Virgin Mary is depicted in a half-figure, slightly turned toward the Christ Child, whom she holds on her left arm while gazing ahead. Her right hand rests on the Child's lap, holding a scepter. The Christ Child sits upright, tilts his head slightly back, holds a closed book in his left hand, and raises his right hand in blessing. Both figures have contemplative expressions, with faces painted in ochre and brown tones, featuring straight noses and large eyes. Only their hands and faces are visible beyond their decorative covering.

A metal covering, added in the early 20th century, depicts the garments of both figures. Mary is clothed in a floral-patterned mantle bordered with trim, along with a gown. Christ wears a simple, pleated robe. Halos encircle both figures' heads, adorned with openwork geometric ornamentation and crowned with orbs and crosses. The scepter held by the Virgin is three-tiered and ends with a cross. An inscription identifying the figures appears in Church Slavonic. The icon features a single votive offering in the shape of a heart, inscribed with the letter M, referring to Mary.

== Bibliography ==
- Matus, I. (2013). Schyłek unii i proces restytucji prawosławia w obwodzie białostockim w latach 30. XIX wieku [The Decline of the Union and the Process of Restitution of Orthodoxy in the Białystok District in the 1830s] (in Polish). Białystok: Wydawnictwo Uniwersytetu w Białymstoku. ISBN 978-83-7431-364-3.
