= Przesieka =

Przesieka may refer to the following places in Poland:

- Przesieka, Lower Silesian Voivodeship (south-west Poland)
- Przesieka, Podlaskie Voivodeship (east Poland)
