= Bryki, Siemiatycze County =

Bryki
- Village
- Location within Poland
- Coordinates: 52°29′N 22°42′E
- Country: Poland
- Voivodeship: Podlaskie
- County: Siemiatycze
- Gmina: Drohiczyn
- Time zone: UTC+1 (CET)
  - Summer (DST): UTC+2 (CEST)
- Vehicle registration: BSI

Bryki [ˈbrɨki] is a village in the administrative district of Gmina Drohiczyn, within Siemiatycze County, Podlaskie Voivodeship, in eastern Poland.

In 1975–1998, the village belonged administratively to the Białystok Voivodeship.

According to the General Census of Population from 1921, the village of Bryki had 27 households and a population of 166. The majority of the inhabitants, numbering 144, declared their affiliation with the Orthodox faith, while the remaining 22 stated their Roman Catholic denomination. At the same time, the majority of the residents, 95 people, identified themselves as Belarusian, while 71 individuals identified as Polish.

In the manorial estates of Bryki Dolne and Bryki Górne, 51 people resided, among whom 41 were Roman Catholic, 5 were Orthodox, and 5 were of Jewish faith. Simultaneously, 42 inhabitants declared Polish nationality, while 9 identified as Belarusian. There were 5 residential buildings in this area.

In the structure of the Polish Orthodox Church, the village falls under the jurisdiction of the parish of Saints Cosmas and Damian in Narojki, while the faithful of the Roman Catholic Church belong to the parish of Saint Roch in Miłkowice-Maćki.
