= Church of the Acheiropoietos, Rogawka =

Orthodox church in Rogawka, Poland

Church of the Acheiropoietos
- Cerkiew Cudownego Zbawiciela
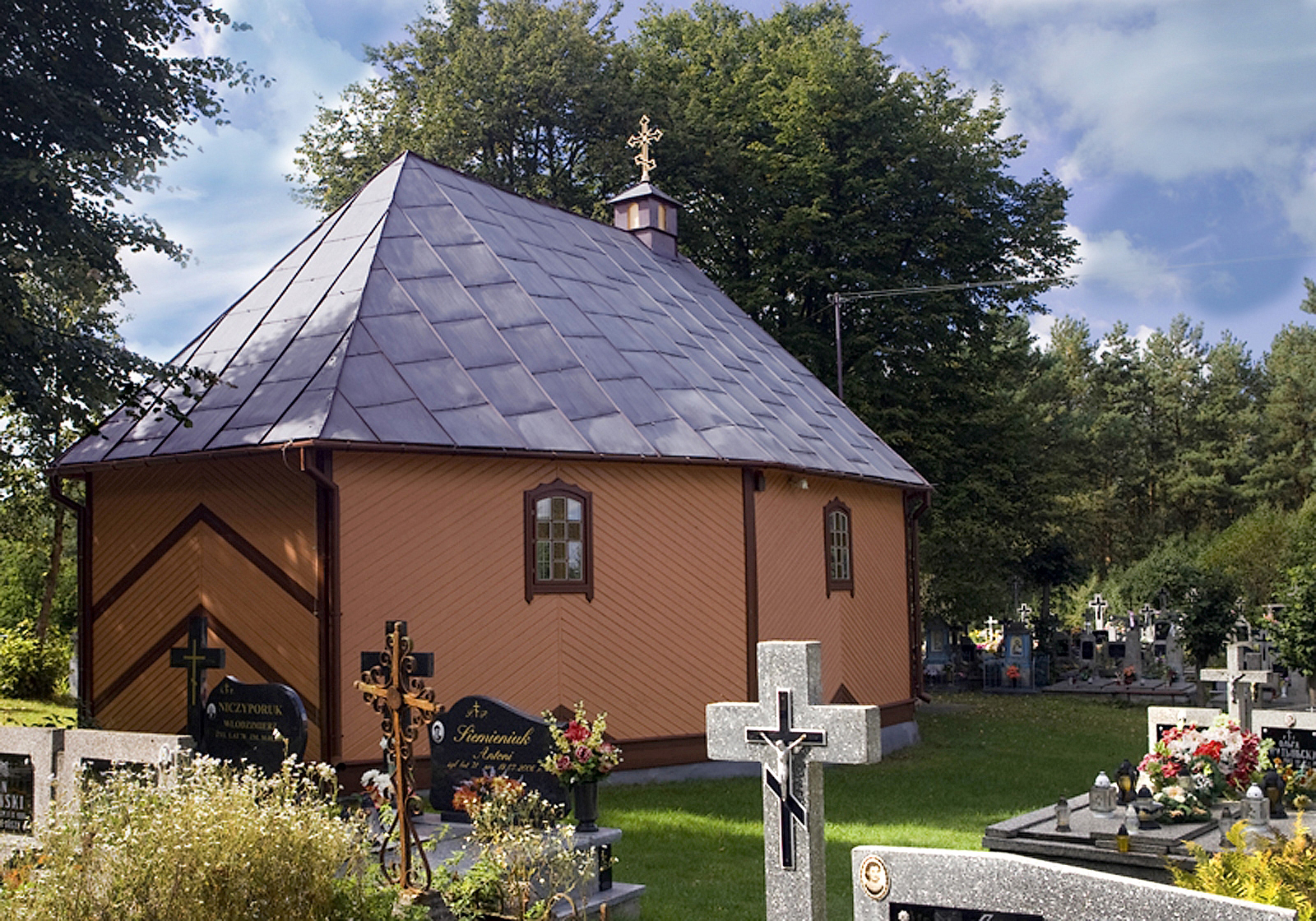
- Church from the east
- Church of the Acheiropoietos
- 52°26′09.8″N 22°47′10.9″E
- Location: Rogawka
- Country: Poland
- Denomination: Eastern Orthodoxy
- Churchmanship: Polish Orthodox Church

History
- Status: active Orthodox church
- Founder: Szymon Szum
- Dedication: Acheiropoieta
- Dedicated: 29 August 2015

Architecture
- Completed: 1854/1858

Specifications
- Materials: wood

Administration
- Diocese: Diocese of Warsaw and Bielsk

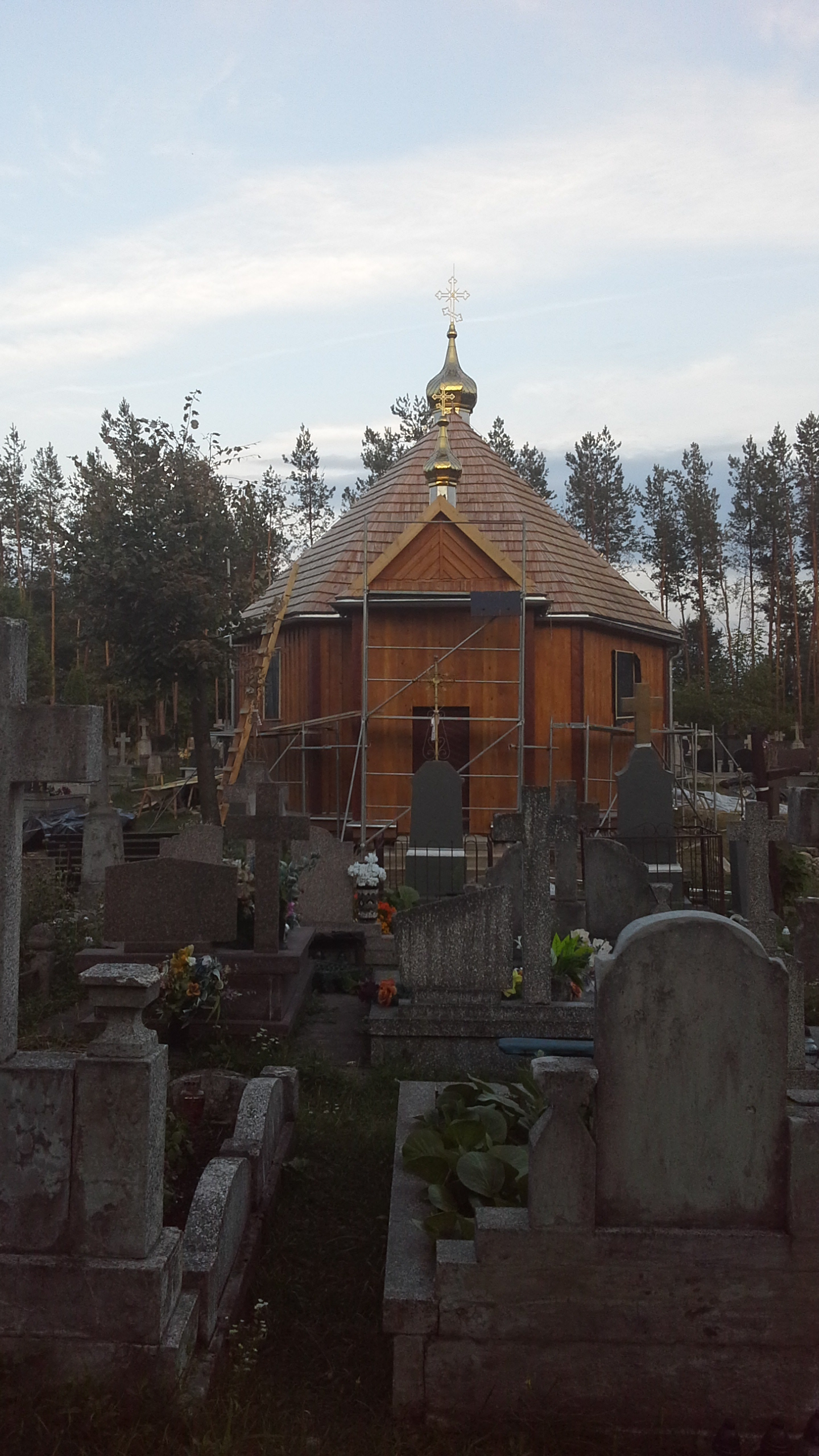
View of the church from the west

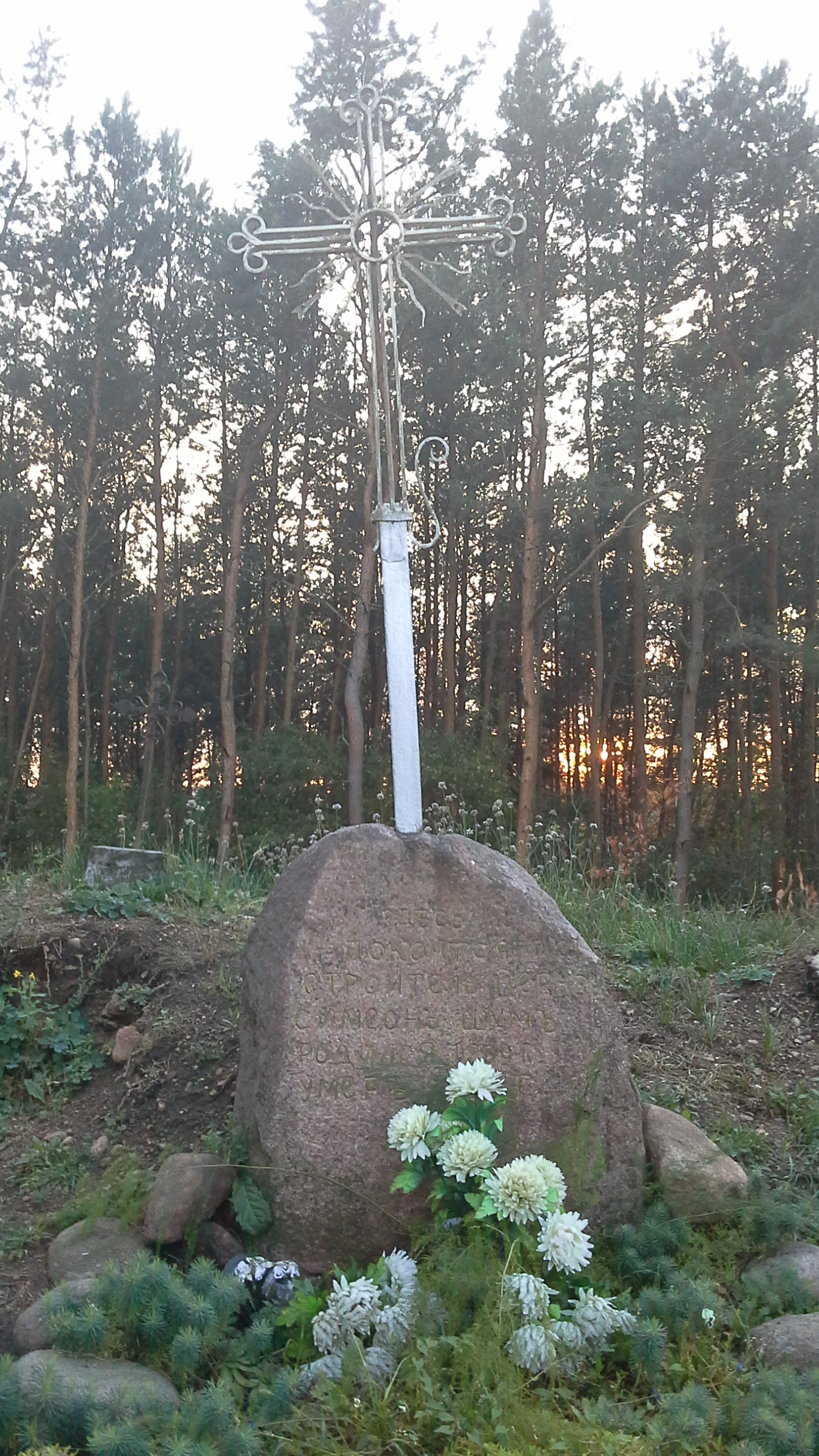
Tombstone of the founder of the church in the cemetery next to the temple

The Church of the Acheiropoietos in Rogawka is an Orthodox parish church that belongs to the Siemiatycze Deanery of the Diocese of Warsaw and Bielsk of the Polish Orthodox Church.

The church was constructed in the 1850s at the initiative of Szymon Szum, a resident of Rogawka, on the site of an older church that had existed since at least 1646. Since its dedication, it has been almost continuously active (with a break during the mass deportation from 1915 to 1918). Until 1996, it was one of the filial sacred objects of the Parish of Saints Peter and Paul in Siemiatycze, after which it became the main church of an independent parish.

Since 1893, the church has been particularly venerated for housing the icon of the Acheiropoietos, which was stolen in 1980 and replaced with an exact copy. Inside the church, there is a 19th-century iconostasis.

The church is located within an Orthodox cemetery situated on a wooded hill approximately 250 meters southwest of the road that passes through Rogawka.

== Dedication ==
Originally, the church in Rogawka was dedicated to St. Simeon Stylites, the patron saint of the church's founder, Szymon Szum. In 1893, the church's patronal feast day was changed to commemorate the Transfer of the Miraculous Image of the Savior on the Cloth from Edessa to Constantinople. That year, a cholera epidemic broke out in the Siemiatycze region. Due to the intermingling of Orthodox and Catholic traditions in the area, the local population customarily prayed to St. Roch, venerated in the Catholic Church as the protector of plague victims, and who was also the patron of the church in nearby Miłkowice. The liturgical feast of St. Roch fell on August 16, which coincided with the Orthodox feast of the Transfer of the Miraculous Image of the Savior on the Cloth according to the Julian calendar. The Orthodox residents of Rogawka, seeking protection from the plague, decided to commission an icon associated with this feast – the icon of the Acheiropoietos. They also adopted this day as the church's patronal feast. In official records of Orthodox parishes, the Rogawka church is listed under the simplified dedication of the Miraculous Savior. In the Catalogue of Art Monuments in Poland, there is an inaccurate mention of a dual dedication to the Acheiropoietos and St. Simeon Stylites, combining the historical and current dedications.

== History ==
The first church in Rogawka was established before 1646 and was dedicated to Demetrius of Thessaloniki. In that year, it was endowed by Anna Lubecka and was initially a Uniate church. By 1726, this church was described as "old". In 1839, the church in Rogawka became the property of the Russian Orthodox Church following the decisions of the Synod of Polotsk, which abolished the Uniate Church in the Russian Empire, except for the Eparchy of Chełm–Belz.

A new church on the site of the old one was funded by Szymon Szum, a resident of Rogawka. According to an inscription that was above the entrance to the church until 1946, this occurred in 1854. (Note: The exact text of the plaque: This chapel was erected through the efforts of Szymon Szum on 3 May 1854 (Sosna & Troc-Sosna (2006, p. 307)).) A later date of 1858 is given by Fyodor Griebenshchikov in his study on the history of the Church of Saints Peter and Paul in Siemiatycze from 1877. The structure was built by a local carpenter. In 1858, a wooden bell tower was erected near the church, housing three bells: two from Węgrów and one from the D. Shmagin's workshop in Moscow.

Between 1863 and 1866, a revered copy of the Galician Icon of the Mother of God from the church in Narojki was kept for veneration in Rogawka while a new Orthodox church was being built in that village.

After the cholera epidemic of 1893, an icon of the Acheiropoietos, written in the same year, became an object of particular veneration in the local Orthodox community. A tradition emerged of processionally carrying the icon from house to house on the patronal feast day so that it visited every Orthodox family in the village. Traditionally, only bachelors could carry the icon, and the priest would pray for the household's prosperity. In the church, the icon was permanently placed in the chancel above the offering table.

In May 1914, the building was clad in wood provided by Jan Szum, the grandson of the church's founder, from his private forest.

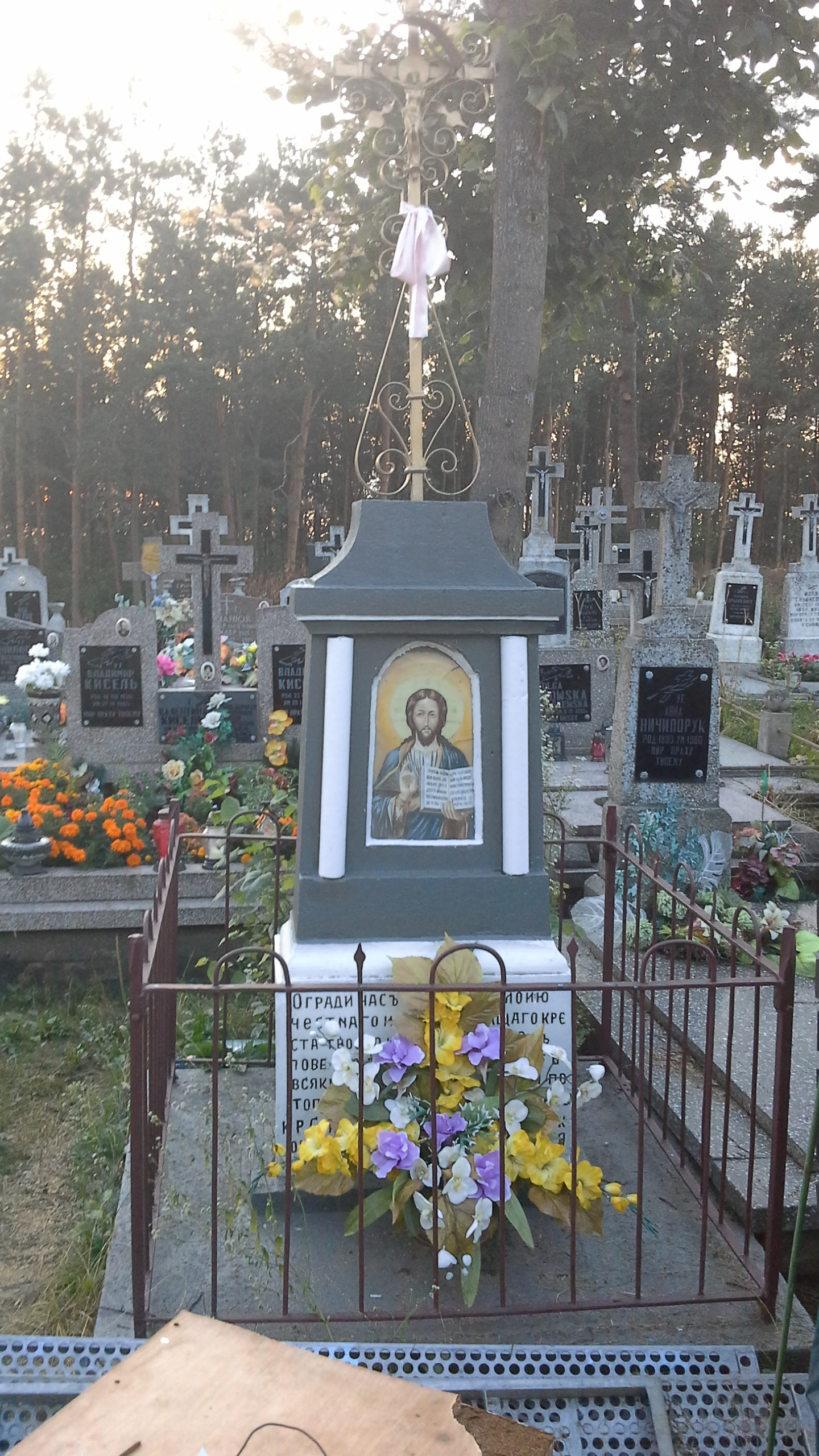
One of the votive crosses put up by the Orthodox population in gratitude for surviving World War I

During World War I, the church remained active until 1915, when most of Rogawka's Orthodox residents were evacuated as part of the mass deportation. Only a few remained, continuing to care for the church and holding services that did not require a priest. Residents of Rogawka, Cecele, Krupice, and Klukowo erected three votive crosses west of the church entrance in gratitude for surviving the war. The building itself suffered no damage during the war.

From 1922 to 1939, the church was particularly cared for by Alexander Szum, the founder's grandson. According to various sources, the church survived World War II without damage and did not require major repairs afterward. Several years after 1945, extensive renovation work was undertaken by the parishioners (including the Szum family) and the vicar of the Orthodox parish in Siemiatycze, Father Grzegorz Sosna. During this period, the shingle roof was replaced with eternit and later with metal. The foundations were secured, the floor and ceiling were replaced, and the interior was paneled with oak. The church was electrified, and copper candleholders and religious paintings were added, created by R. Brzeski, a painter from Siemiatycze. Wiera Nieroszczuk from Kleszczele made a new Golgotha and Resurrection of Christ for the church. The church also acquired additional sets of liturgical vestments, and the altar and prothesis crosses were gilded. The bell tower and bells were renovated, although only one bell remained usable (the other two were damaged). The renovation was entirely funded by the local Orthodox community. From 1973, the church was cared for by another member of the Szum family, Włodzimierz, the great-grandson of the founder.

After World War II, the church was once robbed. This occurred in 1980, and the thieves took the 1893 icon of the Acheiropoietos. The perpetrators were never found. The lost image was replaced by a copy painted by Wiera Nieroszczuk.

The church was listed in the register of monuments on 29 December 1989 under number 731.

In the 1990s, further renovations were carried out: the iconostasis was gilded, water was supplied to the cemetery, which was surrounded by a new fence, and a new gate leading to the church grounds was made.

Until the early 1990s, the church in Rogawka was a filial church of the Parish of Saints Peter and Paul in Siemiatycze, and services were held there every third Sunday. It also served as a cemetery chapel for the Orthodox residents of Rogawka, Klukowo, and Krupice. Since the mid-1990s, the Divine Liturgy has been celebrated weekly, as well as on the feasts of Pascha, Christmas, Pentecost, and on Great Thursday and Great Friday. In August 1996, by decree of Metropolitan Bazyli of Warsaw and all Poland, the church in Rogawka became a parish church. The traditions associated with the patronal icon continue to be observed, attracting pilgrims from other parishes.

On 29 August 2015, after a comprehensive renovation, the church was dedicated by Metropolitan Sawa. In 2018, an icon of St. George with a relic was placed in the church. In 2019, the church received new bells.

== Architecture ==
=== Building structure ===
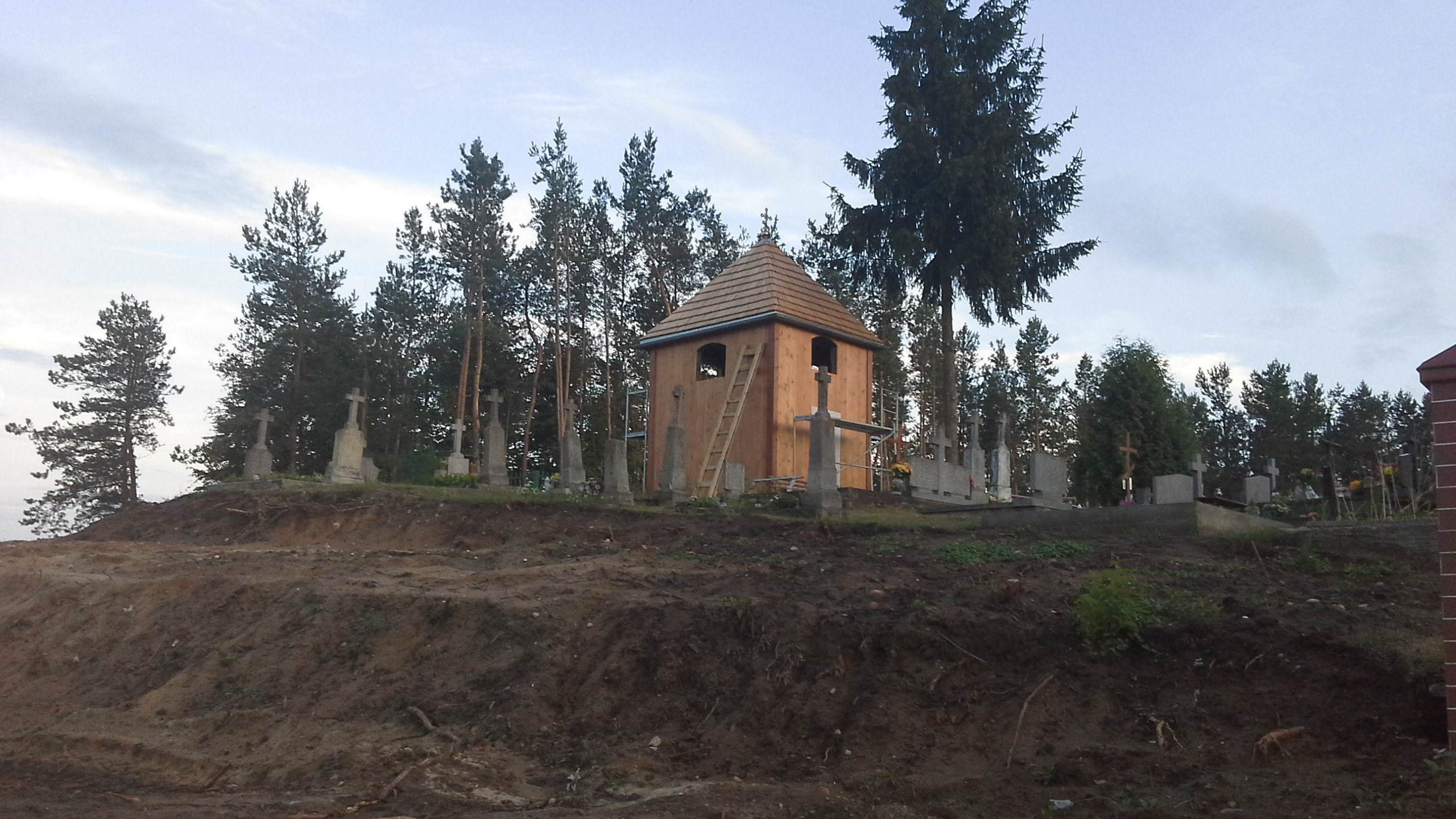
Church's bell tower during major renovations in 2014

The Church of the Acheiropoietos in Rogawka is a wooden structure built in the 19th century. It was constructed on an octagonal plan using log construction techniques. The church is oriented, aisleless, and has a single-nave design. The exterior is clad with wooden siding. The front of the building features a small church porch with a triangular gable topped with a small dome above the entrance. The church is covered with wooden shingles. The multi-hipped roof over the nave includes an octagonal turret at its center, topped with a dome covered in gilded sheet metal and crowned with a six-armed cross. Nearby is a wooden bell tower built on a quadrangular plan with post-and-beam construction, topped with a tented roof also covered with wooden shingles.

=== Interior ===
The church originally housed a single-row 19th-century iconostasis, featuring a depiction of the Last Supper above the royal doors. The icons within the iconostasis were painted in a Renaissance Revival style on a gold background. A new iconostasis, crafted by artisans from Ukraine, was installed in 2016. Other valuable artifacts include an image of the church's former patron, St. Symeon Stylites, dating back to 1860, and a religious painting from the second half of the 19th century, displaying depictions of the Holy Trinity and the Mother of God. In front of the iconostasis, on either side, are displayed a Golgotha (on the left) and the Resurrection of Christ (on the right) for veneration. Above the iconostasis is a Church Slavonic inscription: Priiditie ko mnie wsi trużdajuszczi i obojemiennii i az upokoju wy (Come to Me, all who labor and are heavy laden, and I will give you rest). On the western side of the nave, there is a matroneum with an openwork balustrade.

== Bibliography ==
- Sosna, Grzegorz; Troc-Sosna, Antonina (2006). Święte miejsca i cudowne ikony. Prawosławne sanktuaria na Białostocczyźnie (in Polish). Białystok: Orthdruk. ISBN 83-85368-69-8.
- Sosna, Grzegorz (1989). "Rys historii parafii prawosławnej w Siemiatyczach". In Majecki, H. (ed.). Studia i materiały do dziejów Siemiatycz (in Polish). Warsaw: Państwowe Wydawnictwo Naukowe. ISBN 83-01-07983-5.
