= Lisowo =

Lisowo may refer to the following places:

- Lisowo, Podlaskie Voivodeship (north-east Poland)
- Lisowo, Gryfice County in West Pomeranian Voivodeship (north-west Poland)
- Lisowo, Koszalin County in West Pomeranian Voivodeship (north-west Poland)
- Lisowo, Stargard County in West Pomeranian Voivodeship (north-west Poland)
