= Putkowice Nagórne =

- Village
- Location within Poland
- Coordinates: 52°28′09″N 22°35′42″E
- Country: Poland
- Voivodeship: Podlaskie
- County: Siemiatycze
- Gmina: Drohiczyn
- Time zone: UTC+1 (CET)
  - Summer (DST): UTC+2 (CEST)
- Vehicle registration: BSI

Putkowice Nagórne [putkɔˈvit͡sɛ naˈɡurnɛ] is a village in the administrative district of Gmina Drohiczyn, within Siemiatycze County, Podlaskie Voivodeship, in eastern Poland.

According to the 1921 census, the village was inhabited by 131 people, among whom 126 were Roman Catholic, 3 Jewish, and 2 Orthodox. At the same time, 123 inhabitants declared Polish nationality, and 3 Jewish. There were 27 residential buildings in the village.
