= Zajęczniki =

- Village

- Location within Poland
- Coordinates: 52°24′N 22°45′E
- Country: Poland
- Voivodeship: Podlaskie
- County: Siemiatycze
- Gmina: Drohiczyn
- Time zone: UTC+1 (CET)
  - Summer (DST): UTC+2 (CEST)
- Vehicle registration: BSI

Zajęczniki [zajɛnt͡ʂˈɲikʲi] is a village in the administrative district of Gmina Drohiczyn, within Siemiatycze County, Podlaskie Voivodeship, in eastern Poland. It is situated on the right bank of the Bug River. The national road No. 62 passes through the village. The village lies approximately 7 km (4 mi) east of Drohiczyn, 9 km (6 mi) west of Siemiatycze, and 85 km (53 mi) south of the regional capital Białystok.

In 1921, the village had 54 houses and 412 inhabitants, including 210 Orthodox and 202 Catholics.

In 1954-1957 the village belonged to and was the seat of the authorities of the Zajęczniki commune, after its abolition in the Drohiczyn commune. In 1975–1998, the town administratively belonged to the Białystok Voivodeship.
