= Rogawka =

- Village
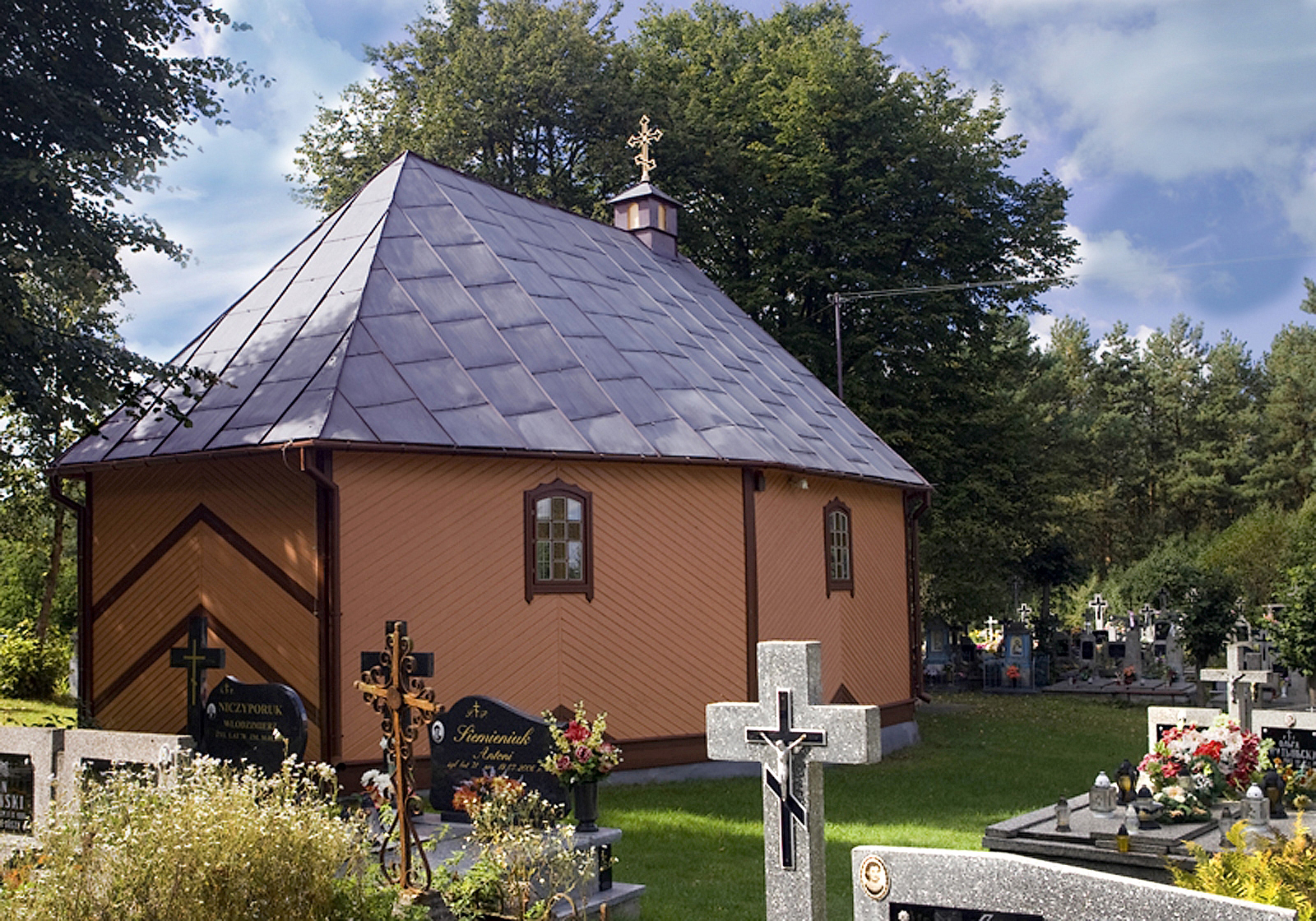
- Church of the Acheiropoietos in Rogawka

- Location within Poland
- Coordinates: 52°26′N 22°48′E
- Country: Poland
- Voivodeship: Podlaskie
- County: Siemiatycze
- Gmina: Siemiatycze

Rogawka [rɔˈɡafka] is a village in the administrative district of Gmina Siemiatycze, within Siemiatycze County, Podlaskie Voivodeship, in north-eastern Poland.
