= Śledzianów =

- Village
- Location within Poland
- Coordinates: 52°30′N 22°34′E
- Country: Poland
- Voivodeship: Podlaskie
- County: Siemiatycze
- Gmina: Drohiczyn
- Time zone: UTC+1 (CET)
  - Summer (DST): UTC+2 (CEST)
- Vehicle registration: BSI

Śledzianów [ɕlɛˈd͡ʑanuf] is a village in the administrative district of Gmina Drohiczyn, within Siemiatycze County, Podlaskie Voivodeship, in eastern Poland.

According to the 1921 census, the village was inhabited by 328 people, among whom 323 were Roman Catholic, 12 Jewish, 6 Orthodox, and 1 Greek Catholic. At the same time, 313 inhabitants declared Polish nationality, 12 Jewish, 6 Belarusian, and 1 another. There were 42 residential buildings in the village.
