= Bujáki =

Bujáki is a Hungarian surname. Buják is a village and municipality in Hungary. Notable people with the surname include:

- Bence Bujaki (born 1993), Hungarian BMX rider
- József Bujáki (born 1975), Hungarian footballer
- Merridee Bujaki, Canadian professor of accounting
