= Bużyski =

- Village
- Location within Poland
- Coordinates: 52°30′N 22°31′E
- Country: Poland
- Voivodeship: Podlaskie
- County: Siemiatycze
- Gmina: Drohiczyn
- Time zone: UTC+1 (CET)
  - Summer (DST): UTC+2 (CEST)
- Vehicle registration: BSI

Bużyski [buˈʐɨski] is a village in the administrative district of Gmina Drohiczyn, within Siemiatycze County, Podlaskie Voivodeship, in eastern Poland.

According to the 1921 census, the village was inhabited by 295 people, among whom 284 were Roman Catholic and 11 Jewish. At the same time, all inhabitants declared Polish nationality. There were 39 residential buildings in the village.
