= Arbasy Małe =

Settlement in Gmina Drohiczyn, Poland

- Settlement
- Location within Poland
- Coordinates: 52°30′31″N 22°33′36″E
- Country: Poland
- Voivodeship: Podlaskie
- County: Siemiatycze
- Gmina: Drohiczyn

Population
  - Total: 36
- Time zone: UTC+1 (CET)
  - Summer (DST): UTC+2 (CEST)
- Vehicle registration: BSI

Arbasy Małe [arˈbasɨ ˈmawɛ] is a settlement in the administrative district of Gmina Drohiczyn, within Siemiatycze County, Podlaskie Voivodeship, in eastern Poland.
