= Miłkowice-Stawki =

Village in Gmina Drohiczyn, Poland

- Village
- Location within Poland
- Coordinates: 52°28′34″N 22°38′01″E
- Country: Poland
- Voivodeship: Podlaskie
- County: Siemiatycze
- Gmina: Drohiczyn
- Postal code: 17-312
- Vehicle registration: BSI

Miłkowice-Stawki [miu̯kɔˈvit͡sɛ ˈstafki] is a village in the administrative district of Gmina Drohiczyn, within Siemiatycze County, Podlaskie Voivodeship, in eastern Poland.
