= Gmina Drohiczyn =

Gmina Drohiczyn Drohiczyn Commune
- Gmina
- Coat of arms
- Interactive map of Gmina Drohiczyn
- Coordinates (Drohiczyn): 52°24′N 22°39′E
- Country: Poland
- Voivodeship: Podlaskie
- County: Siemiatycze
- Seat: Drohiczyn

Area
  - Total: 207.96 km^{2} (80.29 sq mi)

Population (2006)
  - Total: 6,815
  - Density: 32.77/km^{2} (84.88/sq mi)
  - Urban: 2,086
  - Rural: 4,729
- Time zone: UTC+1 (CET)
  - Summer (DST): UTC+2 (CEST)
- Vehicle registration: BSI
- Website: https://www.drohiczyn.pl/

Gmina Drohiczyn is an urban-rural gmina (administrative district) in Siemiatycze County, Podlaskie Voivodeship, in eastern Poland. Its seat is the town of Drohiczyn, which lies approximately 15 kilometres (9 mi) west of Siemiatycze and 87 km (54 mi) south-west of the regional capital Białystok.

The gmina covers an area of 207.96 square kilometres (80.3 sq mi), and as of 2006 its total population is 6,815 (out of which the population of Drohiczyn amounts to 2,086, and the population of the rural part of the gmina is 4,729).

== Villages ==
Apart from the town of Drohiczyn, Gmina Drohiczyn contains the villages and settlements of Arbasy Duże, Arbasy Małe, Bryki, Bujaki, Bużyski, Chechłowo, Chrołowice, Chutkowice, Klepacze, Kłyzówka, Koczery, Lisowo, Lisowo-Janówek, Łopusze, Milewo, Miłkowice-Janki, Miłkowice-Maćki, Miłkowice-Paszki, Miłkowice-Stawki, Minczewo, Narojki, Obniże, Ostrożany, Przesieka, Putkowice Nagórne, Rotki, Runice, Sady, Siekierki, Sieniewice, Skierwiny, Śledzianów, Smarklice, Smorczewo, Sytki, Tonkiele, Wierzchuca Nadbużna, Wierzchuca Nagórna, Wólka Zamkowa and Zajęczniki.

== Neighbouring gminas ==
Gmina Drohiczyn is bordered by the gminas of Grodzisk, Jabłonna Lacka, Korczew, Perlejewo, Platerów, Repki and Siemiatycze.
