= Chechłowo =

- Village
- Location within Poland
- Coordinates: 52°31′N 22°35′E
- Country: Poland
- Voivodeship: Podlaskie
- County: Siemiatycze
- Gmina: Drohiczyn
- Time zone: UTC+1 (CET)
  - Summer (DST): UTC+2 (CEST)
- Vehicle registration: BSI

Chechłowo [xɛˈxwɔvɔ] is a village in the administrative district of Gmina Drohiczyn, within Siemiatycze County, Podlaskie Voivodeship, in eastern Poland.

According to the 1921 census, the village was inhabited by 234 people, among whom 222 were Roman Catholic, 7 Orthodox, 4 Jewish, and 1 Greek Catholic. At the same time, 224 inhabitants declared Polish nationality, 5 Belarusian, 4 Jewish and 1 another. There were 40 residential buildings in the village.
