= Wierzchuca Nagórna =

- Village
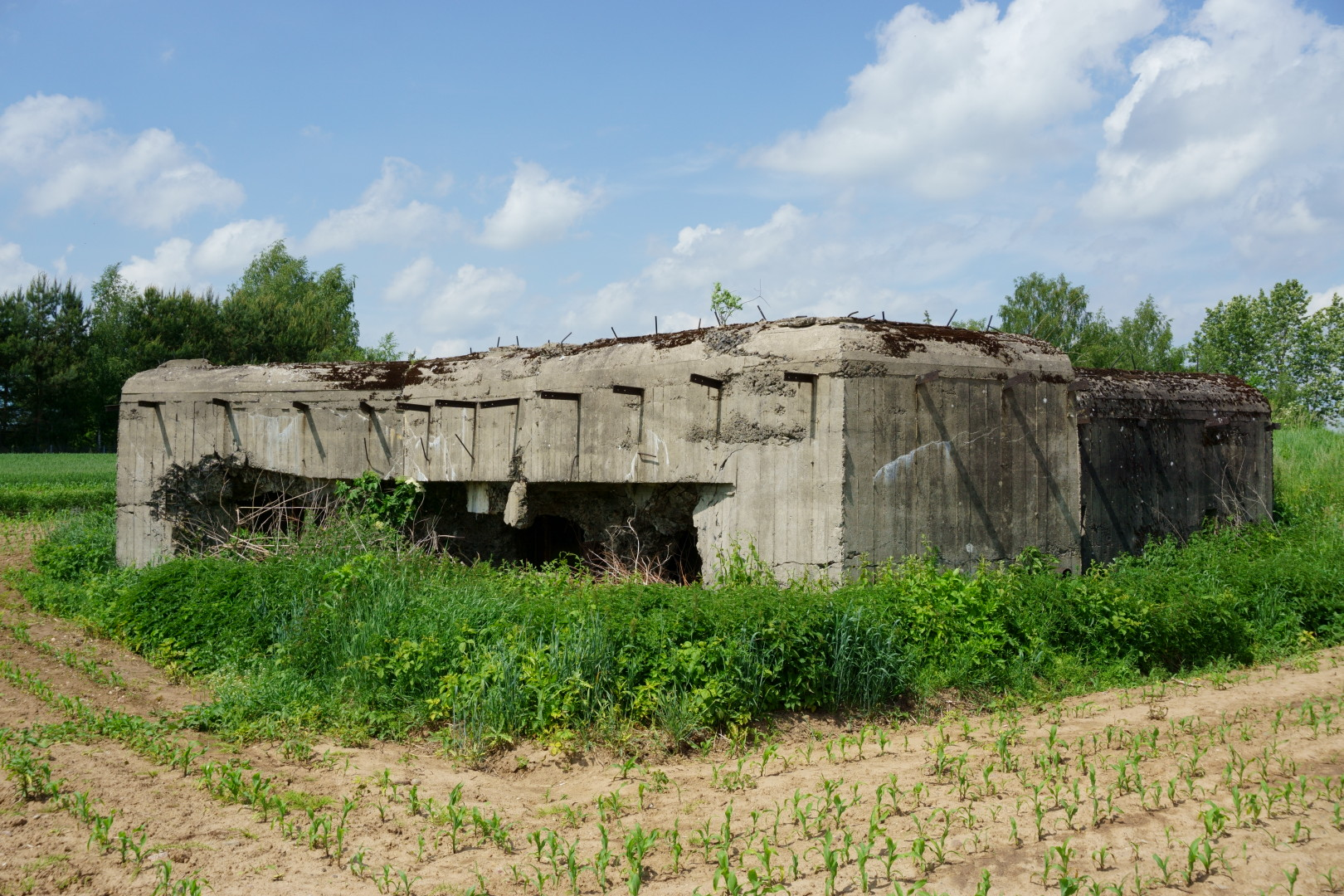
- World War II bunker in Wierzchuca Nagórna

- Location within Poland
- Coordinates: 52°29′N 22°34′E
- Country: Poland
- Voivodeship: Podlaskie
- County: Siemiatycze
- Gmina: Drohiczyn
- Time zone: UTC+1 (CET)
  - Summer (DST): UTC+2 (CEST)
- Vehicle registration: BSI

Wierzchuca Nagórna [vjɛʂˈxut͡sa naˈɡurna] is a village in the administrative district of Gmina Drohiczyn, within Siemiatycze County, Podlaskie Voivodeship, in eastern Poland.

According to the 1921 census, the village was inhabited by 334 people, among whom 315 were Roman Catholic, 17 Jewish, and 2 Orthodox. At the same time, 321 inhabitants declared Polish nationality, 12 Jewish, and 1 Belarusian. There were 50 residential buildings in the village.
