= Chrołowice =

- Village
- Location within Poland
- Coordinates: 52°26′N 22°34′E
- Country: Poland
- Voivodeship: Podlaskie
- County: Siemiatycze
- Gmina: Drohiczyn
- Time zone: UTC+1 (CET)
  - Summer (DST): UTC+2 (CEST)

Chrołowice [xrɔwɔˈvit͡sɛ] is a village in the administrative district of Gmina Drohiczyn, within Siemiatycze County, Podlaskie Voivodeship, in eastern Poland.

== History ==
According to the 1921 census, the village was inhabited by 162 people, among whom 143 inhabitants declared Polish nationality, 13 Jewish and 1 another, and 137 were Roman Catholic, 13 Jewish and 12 Orthodox. There were 24 residential buildings in the village.

Three Polish citizens were murdered by Nazi Germany in the village during World War II.
