= Tonkiele =

- Village
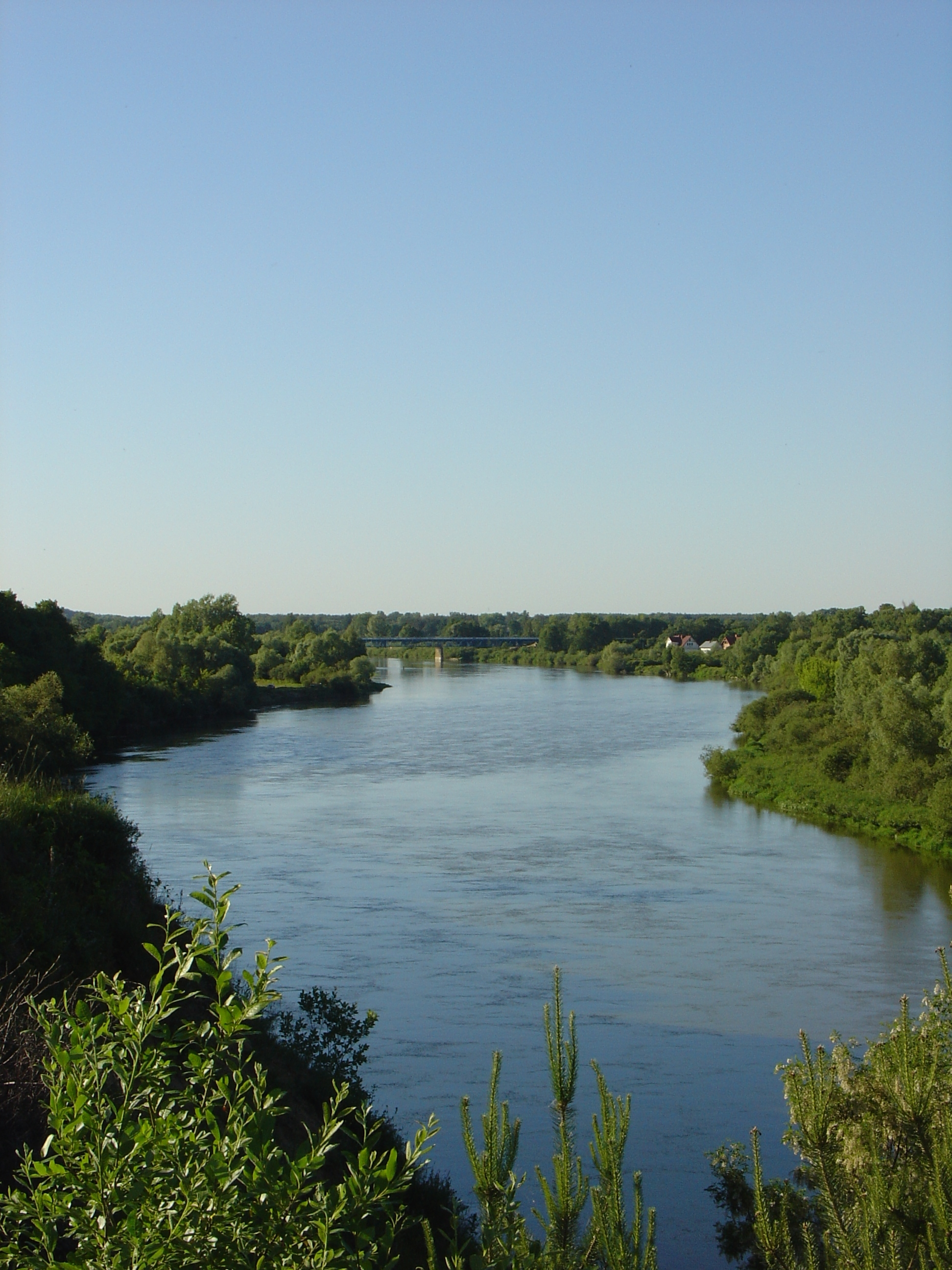
- Bug River in Tonkiele

- Location within Poland
- Coordinates: 52°25′N 22°34′E
- Country: Poland
- Voivodeship: Podlaskie
- County: Siemiatycze
- Gmina: Drohiczyn
- Time zone: UTC+1 (CET)
  - Summer (DST): UTC+2 (CEST)
- Vehicle registration: BSI

Tonkiele [tɔŋˈkʲɛlɛ] is a village in the administrative district of Gmina Drohiczyn, within Siemiatycze County, Podlaskie Voivodeship, in eastern Poland.

== History ==
According to the 1921 census, the village had a population of 192, 96.4% Polish by nationality.

During the German occupation of Poland in World War II, it was the site of large massacres of at least 5,000 Soviet prisoners of war of the Stalag 316 POW camp, including Jews and Communists, perpetrated by the Germans from September to December 1941.
