= Lisowo-Janówek =

Village in Gmina Drohiczyn, Poland

- Village
- Location within Poland
- Coordinates: 52°26′59″N 22°38′08″E
- Country: Poland
- Voivodeship: Podlaskie
- County: Siemiatycze
- Gmina: Drohiczyn
- Time zone: UTC+1 (CET)
  - Summer (DST): UTC+2 (CEST)
- Vehicle registration: BSI

Lisowo-Janówek [liˈsɔvɔ jaˈnuvɛk] is a village in the administrative district of Gmina Drohiczyn, within Siemiatycze County, Podlaskie Voivodeship, in eastern Poland.
