= Wierzchuca Nadbużna =

- Settlement
- Location within Poland
- Coordinates: 52°27′14″N 22°33′16″E
- Country: Poland
- Voivodeship: Podlaskie
- County: Siemiatycze
- Gmina: Drohiczyn
- Time zone: UTC+1 (CET)
  - Summer (DST): UTC+2 (CEST)
- Vehicle registration: BSI

Wierzchuca Nadbużna [vjɛʂˈxut͡sa nadˈbuʐna] is a village in the administrative district of Gmina Drohiczyn, within Siemiatycze County, Podlaskie Voivodeship, in eastern Poland. It has no commercial establishments and consists of a few houses along the east side of the Bug River.
