= Miłkowice-Paszki =

- Village
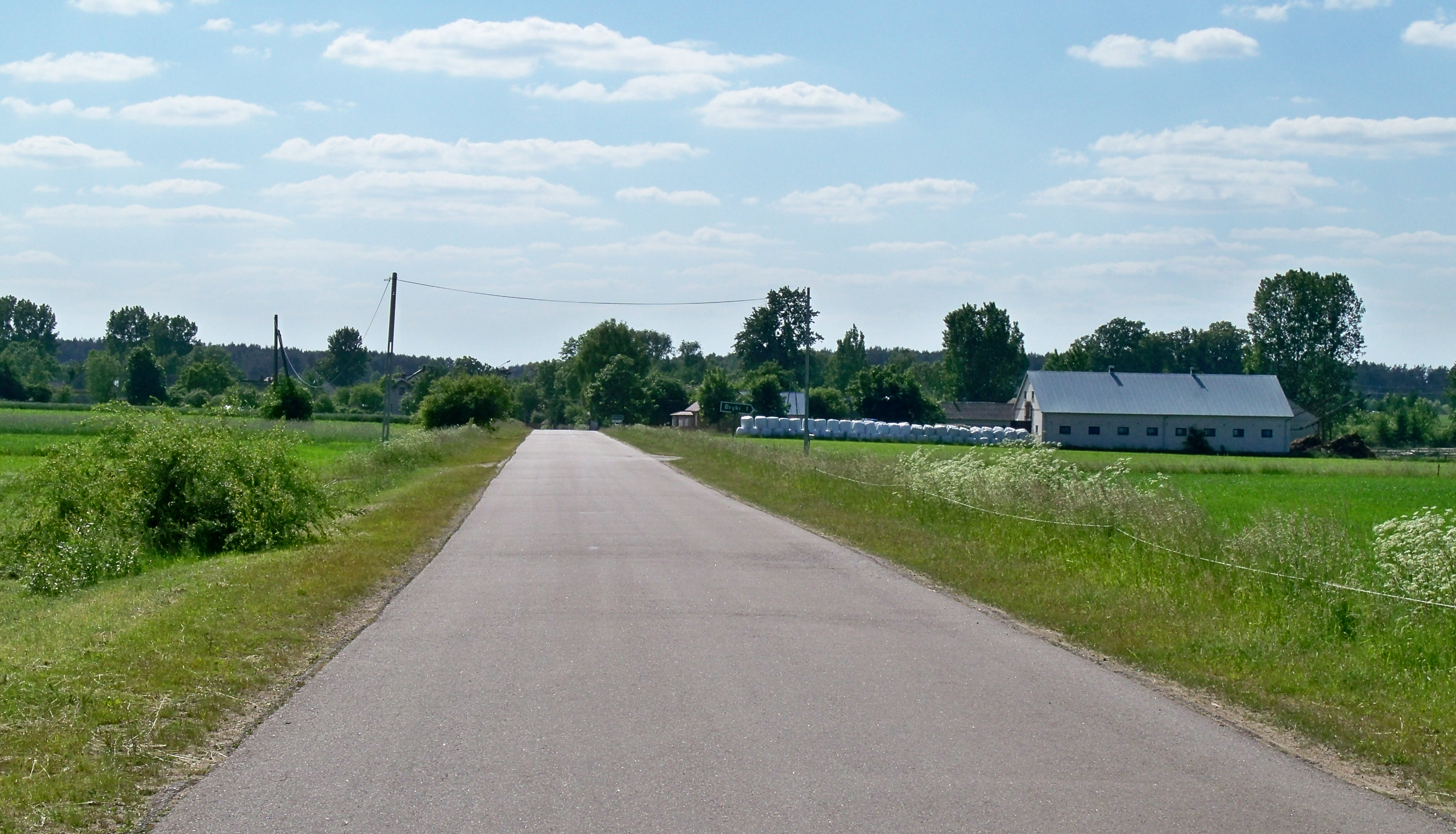
- Paved road in Miłkowice-Paszki

- Location within Poland
- Coordinates: 52°28′23″N 22°40′24″E
- Country: Poland
- Voivodeship: Podlaskie
- County: Siemiatycze
- Gmina: Drohiczyn
- Postal code: 17-312
- Vehicle registration: BSI

Miłkowice-Paszki [miu̯kɔˈvit͡sɛ ˈpaʂki] is a village in the administrative district of Gmina Drohiczyn, within Siemiatycze County, Podlaskie Voivodeship, in eastern Poland.

13 Polish citizens were murdered by Nazi Germany in the village during World War II.
