= Rotki =

- Village
- Location within Poland
- Coordinates: 52°28′25″N 22°36′06″E
- Country: Poland
- Voivodeship: Podlaskie
- County: Siemiatycze
- Gmina: Drohiczyn
- Time zone: UTC+1 (CET)
  - Summer (DST): UTC+2 (CEST)
- Vehicle registration: BSI

Rotki [ˈrɔtki] is a village in the administrative district of Gmina Drohiczyn, within Siemiatycze County, Podlaskie Voivodeship, in eastern Poland.

== History ==
=== World War II ===
During German occupation of Poland in World War II, the Nazis set up a stone quarry in Rotki for the purpose of slave labor by the Polish Jews from the Łomża Ghetto. About three hundred people worked in it, before they were shipped to Auschwitz for extermination in November 1942.
