= Obniże =

- Village
- Location within Poland
- Coordinates: 52°30′N 22°36′E
- Country: Poland
- Voivodeship: Podlaskie
- County: Siemiatycze
- Gmina: Drohiczyn
- Time zone: UTC+1 (CET)
  - Summer (DST): UTC+2 (CEST)
- Vehicle registration: BSI

Obniże [ɔbˈniʐɛ] is a village in the administrative district of Gmina Drohiczyn, within Siemiatycze County, Podlaskie Voivodeship, in eastern Poland.

According to the 1921 census, the village was inhabited by 209 people, among whom 196 were Roman Catholic and 13 Jewish. At the same time, 201 inhabitants declared Polish nationality, 8 Jewish. There were 39 residential buildings in the village.
