= Lisowo, Podlaskie Voivodeship =

Lisowo
- Village
- Location within Poland
- Coordinates: 52°27′N 22°37′E
- Country: Poland
- Voivodeship: Podlaskie
- County: Siemiatycze
- Gmina: Drohiczyn
- Time zone: UTC+1 (CET)
  - Summer (DST): UTC+2 (CEST)
- Vehicle registration: BSI

Lisowo [liˈsɔvɔ] is a village in the administrative district of Gmina Drohiczyn, within Siemiatycze County, Podlaskie Voivodeship, in eastern Poland.

According to the 1921 census, the village was inhabited by 304 people, among whom 290 were Roman Catholic, 8 Orthodox, and 6 Jewish. At the same time, 299 inhabitants declared Polish nationality, 5 Belarusian. There were 37 residential buildings in the village.
