= Miłkowice-Maćki =

- Village
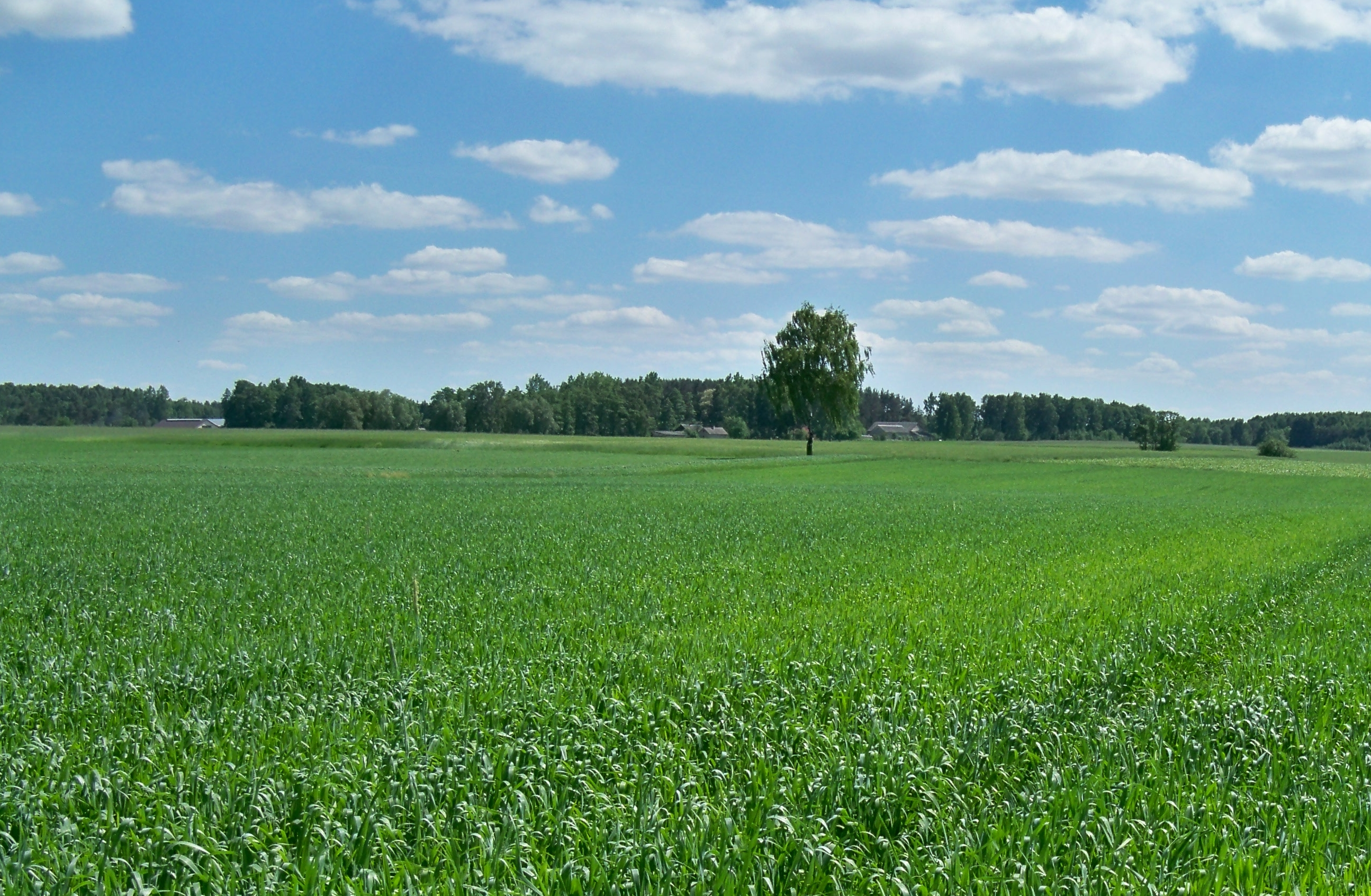
- A view from the fields to the south-west hamlet on the border with Miłkowice-Maćki

- Location within Poland
- Coordinates: 52°27′51″N 22°40′08″E
- Country: Poland
- Voivodeship: Podlaskie
- County: Siemiatycze
- Gmina: Drohiczyn
- Time zone: UTC+1 (CET)
  - Summer (DST): UTC+2 (CEST)
- Postal code: 17-312
- Vehicle registration: BSI

Miłkowice-Maćki [miu̯kɔˈvit͡sɛ ˈmat͡ɕki] is a village in the administrative district of Gmina Drohiczyn, within Siemiatycze County, Podlaskie Voivodeship, in eastern Poland.

== History ==
Four Polish citizens were murdered by Nazi Germany in the village during World War II.
