= Merridee Bujaki =

Canadian accountant

- Education: Queen's University
- Known for: Annual Report Disclosure Practices; Women in Management
- Awards: Welch LLP Fellow in Accounting; ICAO Doctoral Fellow
- Scientific career
- Fields: Accounting
- Workplaces: University of Ottawa; PricewaterhouseCoopers

Dr. Merridee Bujaki is a tenured professor of accounting at the University of Ottawa located in Ottawa, Ontario, Canada.

In 2005, she became tenured as a full-time professor. She is also the Secretary-Treasurer for the Association of Professors at the University of Ottawa and VP of Communications for the Canadian Academic Accounting Association. Bujaki's primary activities are accounting and organizational behavior research.

== Education ==
In 1985, Bujaki graduated with a Bachelor of Arts Degree, majoring in Psychology. In 1988, she received her Master of Business Administration (MBA) degree specializing in Accounting. In 1996, Bujaki completed her Ph.D. degree with a dissertation topic related to accounting and Organizational Behavior. All three qualifications were obtained at Queen's University.

== Work experience ==
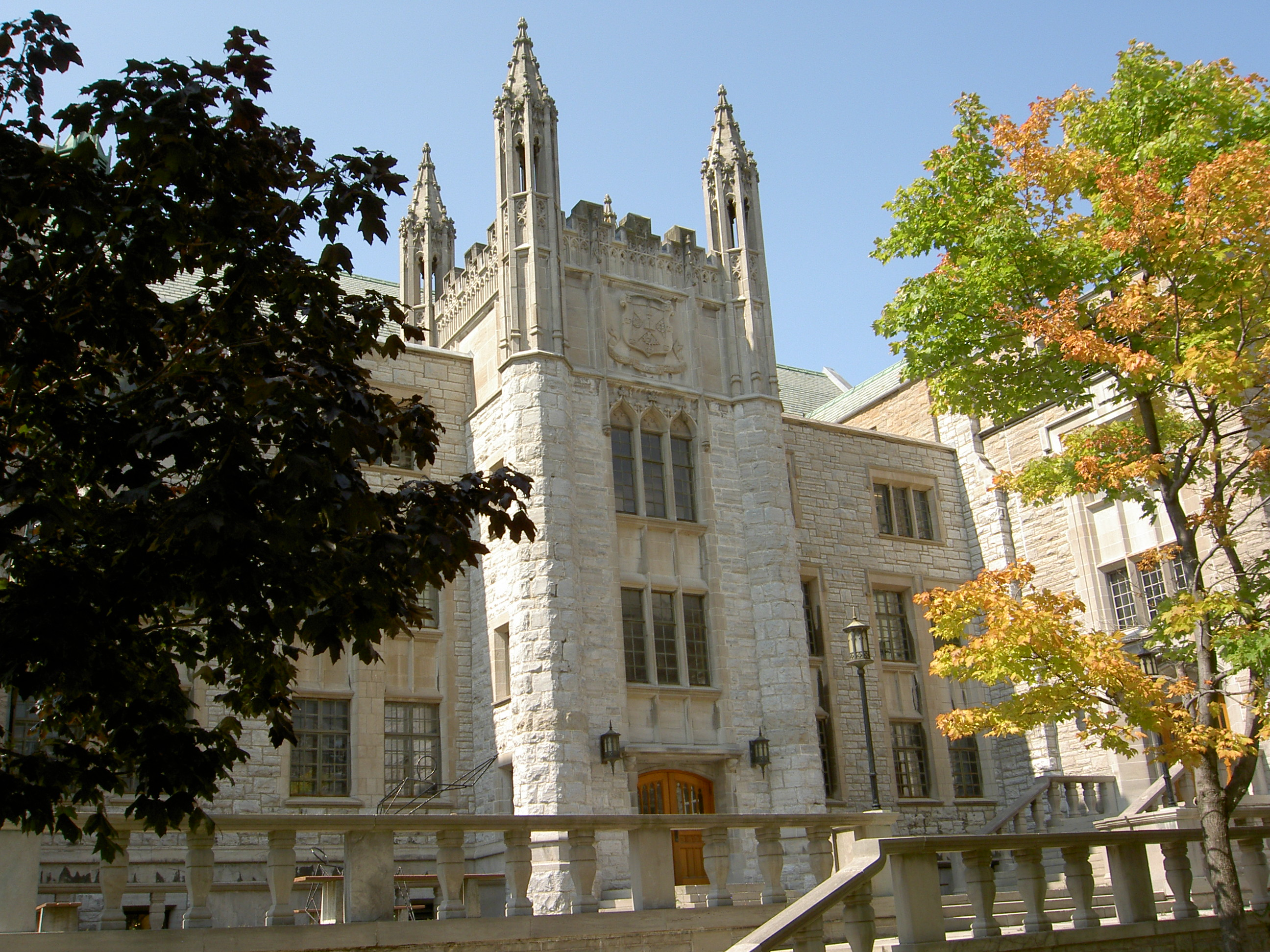
Queen's University Douglas Library

After graduating from her MBA program, Bujaki joined the Toronto office of international accounting firm Price Waterhouse. Throughout her academic career, she has worked on consulting projects for the Canadian Institute of Chartered Accountants (CICA). She has also served as a seminar leader and case reviewer for the Institute of Chartered Accountants of Ontario (ICAO) School of Accountancy.

== Research interests ==
Bujaki's research interests are primarily concentrated in four areas. They include measurement and validity issues in accounting research, annual report disclosures, women in management and the work-family interface. Bujaki's articles have been published in several journals.

=== Disclosure Practices ===
Bujaki and fellow researcher Bruce McConomy, have found that most public companies will voluntarily disclose their governance practices based on strategic factors.

=== Women in Management ===
Bujaki and fellow researcher Carol McKeen, published an article entitled Hours Spent on Household Tasks by Business School Graduates. Bujaki and McKeen's findings suggest that household and family responsibilities negatively affect a woman's career success more than a male's career success. They also notice that the presence of children significantly increases time spent on household activities. With children, household tasks grow from 3 to 10 hours a week for male graduates, while for female graduates, it grows from 10 hours a week to 20 hours a week. Bujaki and McKeen suggest that organizational initiatives and changes in expectations within family and society are needed to effectively accommodate a graduate's career success and their household responsibilities.

=== Rideau Canal ===
In 2007, Bujaki received a $27,886 Research Development Initiatives grant from the Social Sciences and Humanities Research Council of Canada (SSHRC). This grant was given for her research program of the accounting and management history of the Rideau Canal. The report program is entitled The Rideau Waterway: Management, Accounting, Governance and Accountability and will study the evolution of management practices over the life of the canal.

=== Gender-based inclusion ===
Bujaki worked with the Centre for Research on Inclusion at Work (CRIW) from 2012 to 2022.

In 2018, Bujaki was part of a team which was awarded a SSHRC grant in 2018 and worked on a project entitled, "Healthy Professionals/Knowledge Workers: Examining the Gendered Nature of Mental Health Issues, Leaves of Absence and Return to Work Experiences from a Comparative Perspective".
