= Przesieka, Podlaskie Voivodeship =

Przesieka
- Settlement
- Location within Poland
- Coordinates: 52°29′29″N 22°34′50″E
- Country: Poland
- Voivodeship: Podlaskie
- County: Siemiatycze
- Gmina: Drohiczyn
- Time zone: UTC+1 (CET)
  - Summer (DST): UTC+2 (CEST)
- Vehicle registration: BSI

Przesieka [pʂɛˈɕɛka] is a settlement in the administrative district of Gmina Drohiczyn, within Siemiatycze County, Podlaskie Voivodeship, in eastern Poland.
