= Joy of All Who Sorrow Church, Koterka =

Orthodox church in Koterka, Poland

Coordinates: 52°21′29.0″N 23°14′02.8″E

Joy of All Who Sorrow Church
- Cerkiew Ikony Matki Bożej "Wszystkich Strapionych Radość"
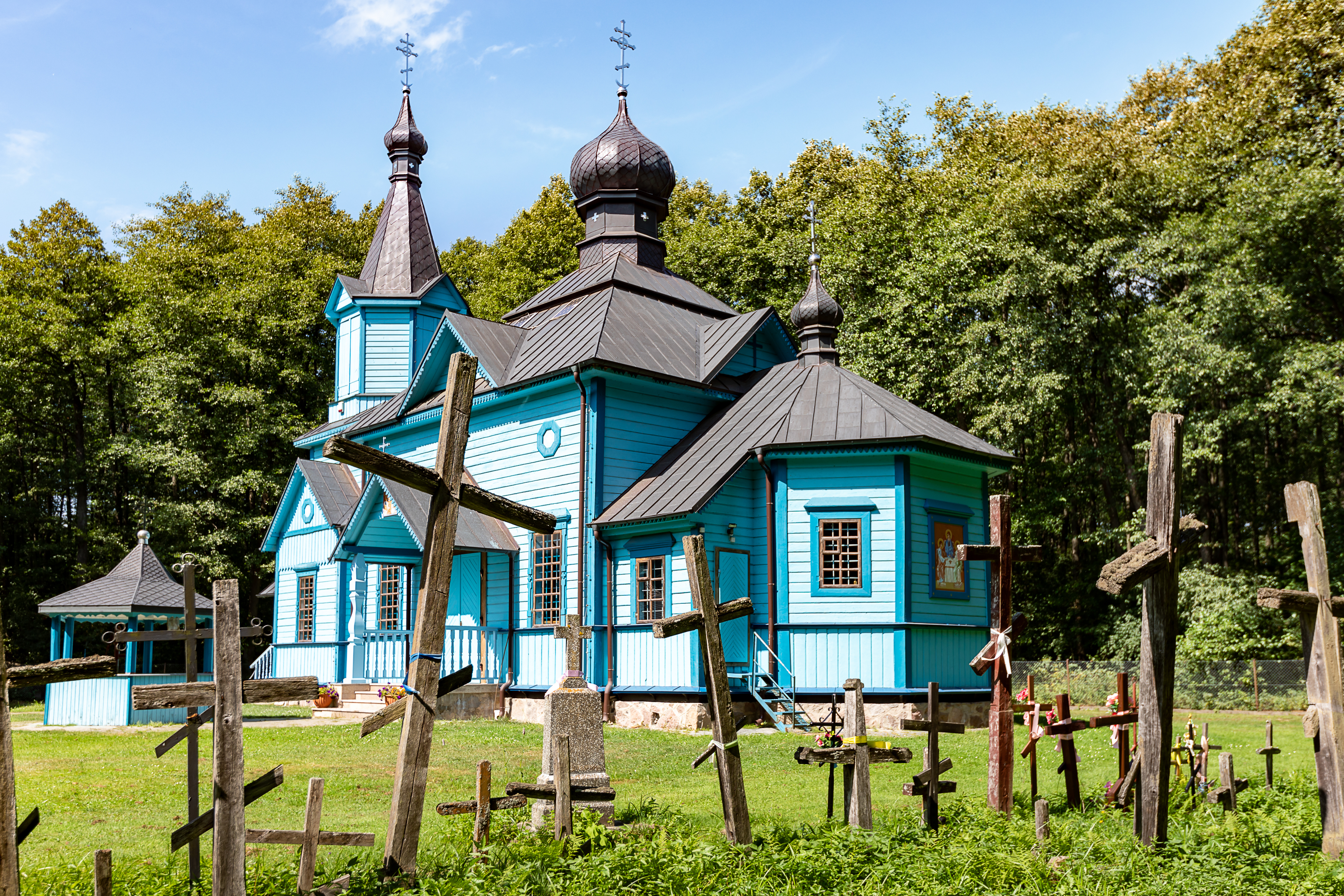
- Joy of All Who Sorrow Church
- Location: Koterka
- Country: Poland
- Denomination: Eastern Orthodoxy
- Religious institute: Polish Orthodox Church

History
- Status: active
- Dedication: Joy of All Who Sorrow
- Dedicated: July 29, 1912

Architecture
- Years built: 1909–1912

Specifications
- Materials: wood

Administration
- Diocese: Diocese of Warsaw and Bielsko

The Joy of All Who Sorrow Church is an Orthodox church in Koterka (a parish in Tokary), in the Siemiatycze Deanery of the Diocese of Warsaw and Bielsko of the Polish Orthodox Church.

The Orthodox parish in Tokary was established no later than the 16th century; from the 17th century until 1839, it was a Uniate building. In the mentioned year, it was incorporated into the Russian Orthodox Church under the provisions of the Synod of Polotsk. The church in Koterka was built between 1909 and 1912 as a filial temple of this parish, on the site where a Mary apparition was supposed to have occurred in 1852. It was not recognized by the Russian Orthodox Church, yet pilgrims visited the site, and miraculous healings were said to have occurred. In 1906, Bishop Michał of Grodno approved the construction of a church at this location, which was financed by the believers' donations. In 1948, due to the division of the village of Tokary following the delineation of the Polish-Soviet border, the church became the parish church. Despite the depopulation of the surrounding villages, it remains an important pilgrimage destination.

The church is located in a forest, near the settlement of Koterka, in the area of the same name, also called by the faithful the Holy Place.

== History ==
The Orthodox parish in Tokary is first mentioned at the end of the 16th century. In 1592, its church was described as "ancient". The parish operated within the structures of the Diocese of Volodymyr and Brest and later Ukrainian Catholic Eparchy of Volodymyr–Brest (the moment of the parish's transition to the Union is not established). The parish in Tokary was reintegrated into the Orthodox Church following the decisions of the Synod of Polotsk in 1839, along with all the other Uniate outposts in Podlachia. Earlier, in 1816, a new parish church was built in Tokary.

=== Events of 1852 and development of the cult ===
The construction of the church in Koterka, subordinate to the temple in Tokary, occurred in connection with an apparition of Mary that was said to have taken place on the Feast of the Holy Trinity in 1852. The Virgin Mary was said to have appeared to a local peasant girl named Eufrozyna Iwaszczuk in the Koterka glade, where she was gathering sorrel instead of going to church on the holy day. As Iwaszczuk recounted, Mary announced that the feast had been established for prayer in the temple on that day, not for work. She also foretold that the sins of the villagers would be punished by a pestilential air. She instructed Iwaszczuk to go to the parson and tell him to pray with the parishioners for forgiveness of sins. The parson of Tokary, Symon Budiłowicz, erected a cross in the glade. This place began to attract numerous pilgrims, not only Orthodox, and reports of miraculous healings emerged.

To determine whether the events in Koterka were a miracle according to the church, a special commission was appointed in June 1852 by the Russian Orthodox Diocese of Lithuania. In September of the same year, it concluded that no miracle had occurred. The parson of Tokary, who had encouraged pilgrimage to the glade even before the verdict, was removed from his position. The cross placed in Koterka was ordered to be moved to the local Orthodox cemetery. However, pilgrimages did not cease, and healings were still reported. Those coming to Tokary considered the spring that appeared at the site where the cross originally stood as miraculous. Particularly numerous pilgrims arrived in Tokary during the Feast of the Holy Trinity. Due to the negative opinion of the Russian Orthodox Diocese of Lithuania, no services were held at the glade, and requests by parsons to build a chapel there were rejected.

=== Construction of the church ===
In 1900, the Eparchy of Grodno and Brest was established, within which the parish in Tokary was included. Bishop Michał of Grodno agreed to the development of the sanctuary in Koterka in 1906. On 9 May 1909, the foundation stone was laid for the construction of the temple at the glade.

The construction of the church lasted for three years and was financed by donations. Anna Briantseva from Kazan, who claimed to have been healed in Koterka, donated liturgical utensils worth over 1,200 rubles to the temple. The forester from Mielnik, Porecki, donated wood from 264 pine trees for construction. The Administration of Agricultural and State Estates in Grodno allocated the rest of the wood for half of its value (600 rubles). Assistance also came from the parish in Mielnik. On 29 July 1912, the completed church was dedicated by the abbot of the St. Onuphrius Monastery in Jabłeczna, Archimandrite Seraphim, who replaced Bishop Vladimir of Białystok, who was originally invited to the ceremony. The parish chronicle records that a significant group of faithful were present at the dedication. In 1915, Orthodox residents of Tokary fled during World War I, causing the local parish activity to cease.

=== Functioning after 1918 ===
The prestige of the sanctuary in Koterka grew further during the interwar period, when Metropolitan of Warsaw and all Poland, Dionysius, visited the shrine on the Feast of the Holy Trinity. The parish chronicle from this period recorded additional cases of healings. However, most testimonies of healings were not documented, and knowledge of them exists only in oral tradition. The faithful came to the temple not only on the Feast of the Holy Trinity but also on the patronal feast day.

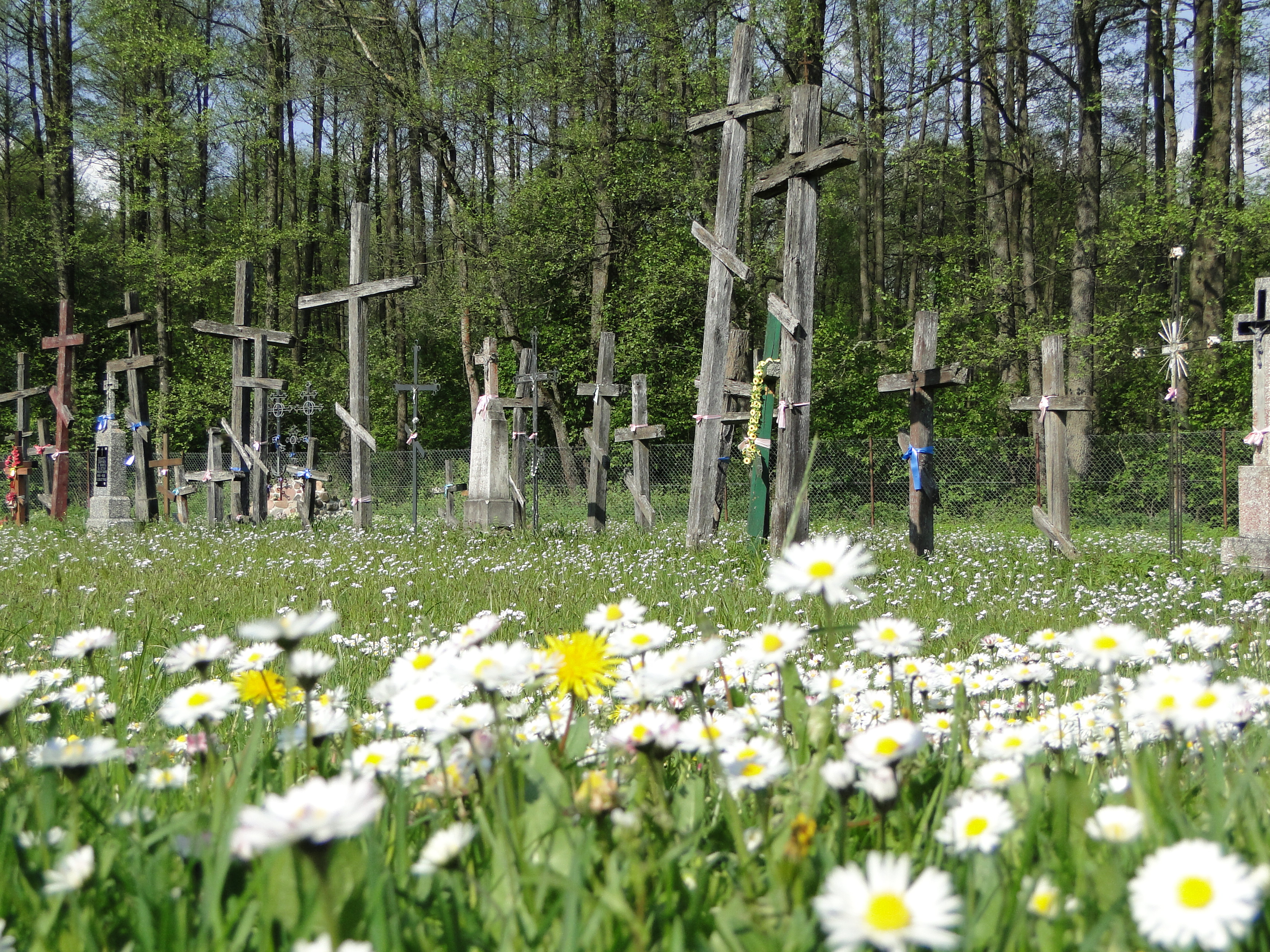
Crosses near the church in Koterka

In 1948, the church in Koterka became the parish church because, after the establishment of the Polish-Soviet border, the St. Michael the Archangel Church in Tokary fell within the territory of the Byelorussian Soviet Socialist Republic, where most of the Orthodox residents' houses were also located. In the new political situation, pilgrimages from Belarus became impossible. It was only in 1990 that a solemn procession was organized with the participation of several thousand faithful and 15 priests from the Polish part of Tokary to the Belarusian part. The church continues to be an important pilgrimage center despite the decline in the population of neighboring villages. Metropolitan of Warsaw and All Poland, Sawa, presided over the Feast of the Holy Trinity celebrations in Koterka several times, and bishops Grzegorz of Bielsko (in 1998) and Jerzy of Siemiatycze (in 2007) also visited the temple. The church was entered into the list of heritage registers on 28 December 1984, under No. A-64. In 2012, the centenary of the construction of the church was commemorated by placing a six-meter cross with a painting by Jarosław Wiszenko, funded by foresters from the Nurzec Stacja forestry, next to it. There are also other wooden votive crosses near the temple.

In the early 21st century, the temple underwent renovations. After the completion of the works, the church was dedicated on 4 September 2016, by Metropolitan of Warsaw and All Poland, Sawa.

== Architecture ==
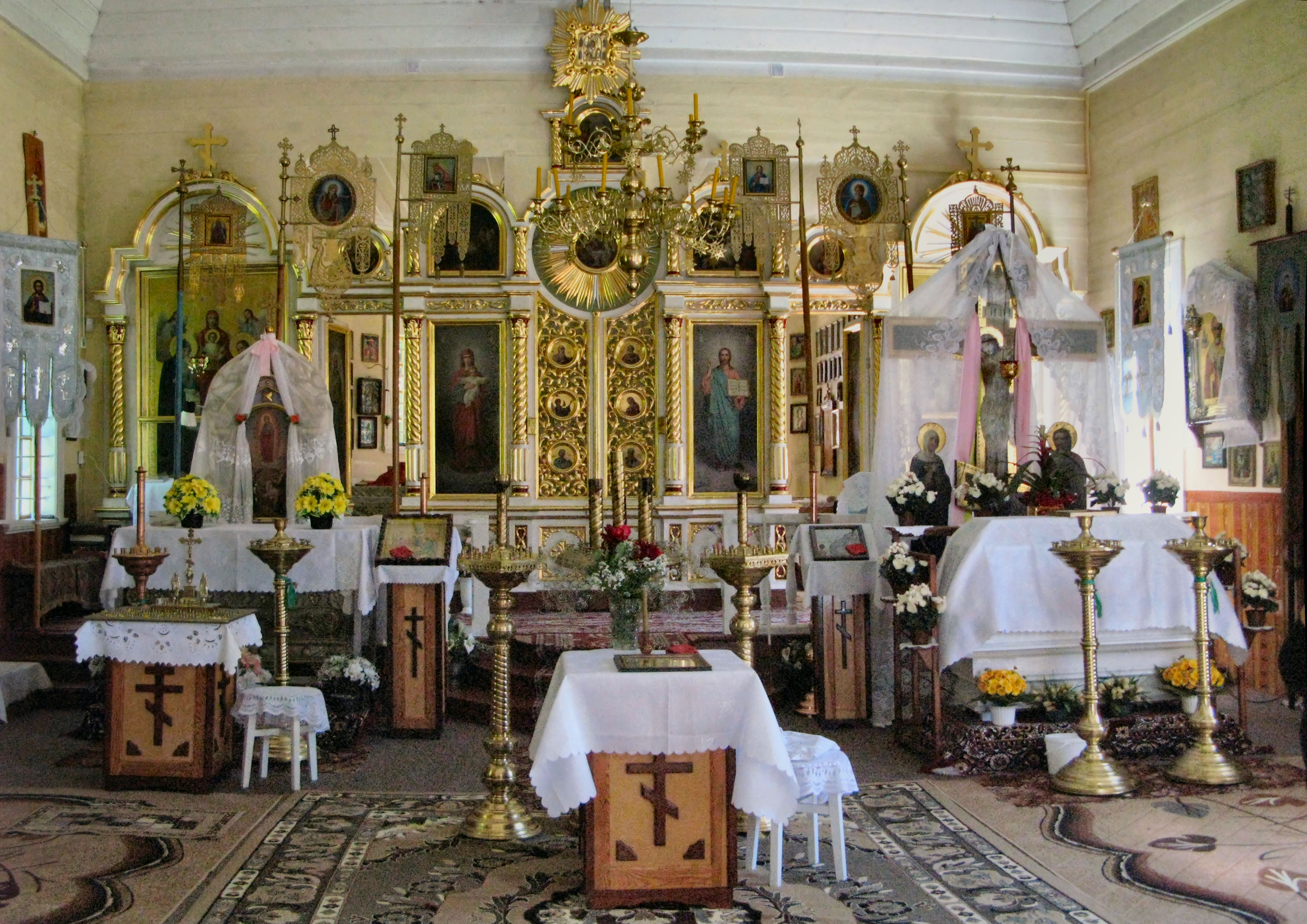
Interior of the church

The church is a wooden structure with a log construction, clad in formwork, oriented, and divided into three sections (church porch, nave, chancel), erected on a cross-shaped plan. Covered porches supported by two profiled pillars are located at the main and side entrances. The nave of the church is built on a square plan, the chancel on a rectangular plan with a three-sided apse, and the church porch also on a rectangular plan. The church roofs are metal sheeted; a hip roof covers the nave, while the church porch and porches have gable roofs. The church has one roof lantern with an onion-like tented roof. A tower rises above the church porch, octagonal in plan, crowned with a steep roof and a small dome. Near the church is a spring surrounded by a shelter, which is revered.

Inside the church, there is a double-row iconostasis. In front of it, for worship, stands Golgotha and the patronal icon, while above the iconostasis hangs the icon of the Intercession of the Theotokos. The patronal icon, measuring 106 by 170 cm, is placed in an icon case in front of the iconostasis, to the left. It was painted on cypress wood.

== Bibliography ==
- Sosna, Grzegorz (2006). Święte miejsca i cudowne ikony. Prawosławne sanktuaria na Białostocczyźnie (in Polish). Orthdruk. ISBN 83-85368-69-8.
- Kołomajska-Saeed, M., ed. (1996). Katalog zabytków sztuki w Polsce. Siemiatycze, Drohiczyn i okolice (in Polish). Warsaw: Instytut Sztuki Polskiej Akademii Nauk.
