= Adamowo-Zastawa =

- Village
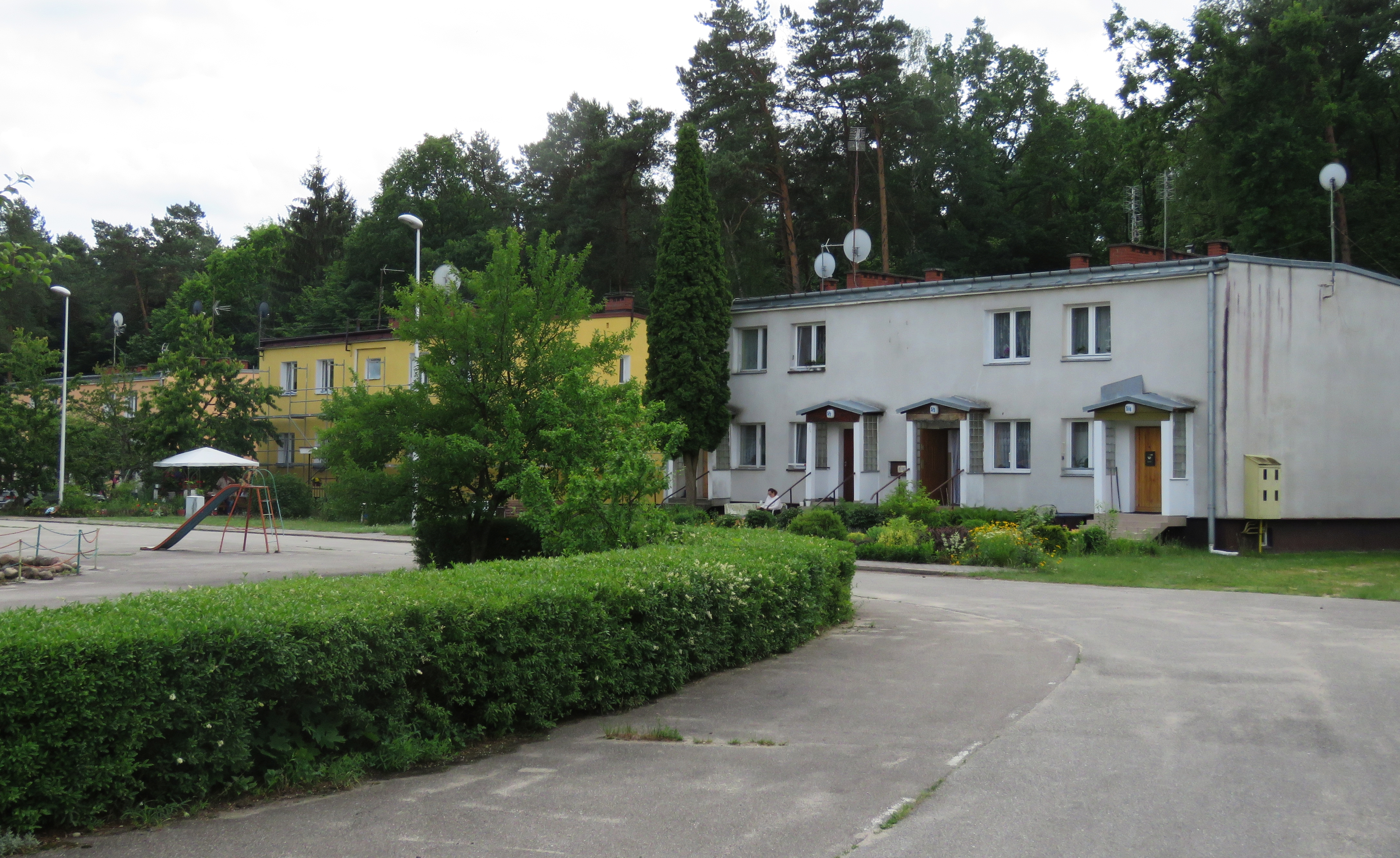

- Location within Poland
- Coordinates: 52°22′N 23°7′E
- Country: Poland
- Voivodeship: Podlaskie
- County: Siemiatycze
- Gmina: Mielnik
- Population: 160

Adamowo-Zastawa [adaˈmɔvɔ zasˈtava] is a village in the administrative district of Gmina Mielnik, within Siemiatycze County, Podlaskie Voivodeship, in north-eastern Poland, close to the border with Belarus. Through the village runs Voivodeship road 640 as well as Druzhba pipeline.
