= Moszczona Królewska =

- Village
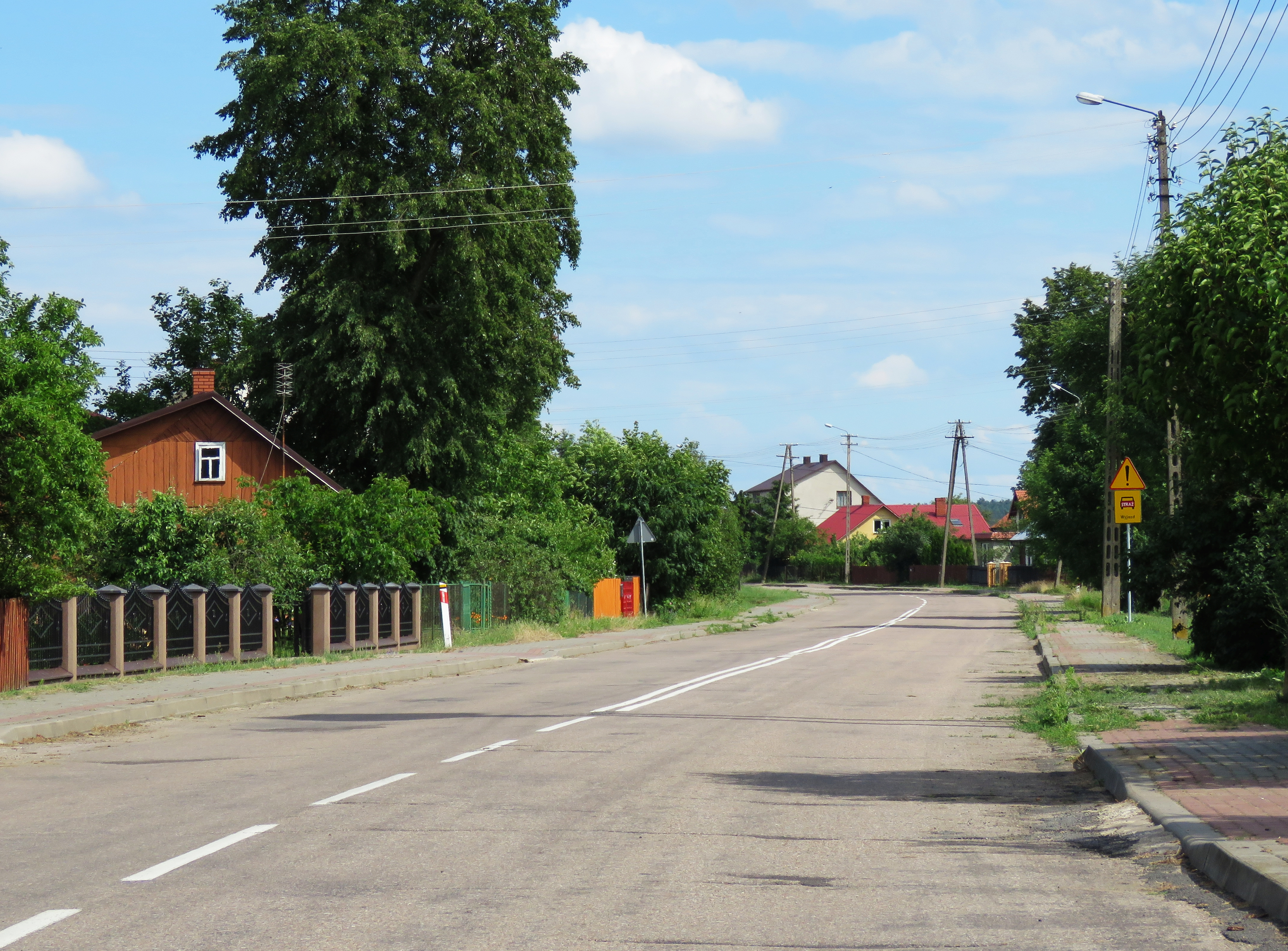

- Location within Poland
- Coordinates: 52°23′N 23°0′E
- Country: Poland
- Voivodeship: Podlaskie
- County: Siemiatycze
- Gmina: Mielnik
- Postal code: 17-307
- Vehicle registration: BSI

Moszczona Królewska [mɔʂˈt͡ʂɔna kruˈlɛfska] is a village in the administrative district of Gmina Mielnik, within Siemiatycze County, Podlaskie Voivodeship, in eastern Poland, close to the border with Belarus.

Five Polish citizens were murdered by Nazi Germany in the village during World War II.
