= Osłowo, Podlaskie Voivodeship =

Osłowo
- Village
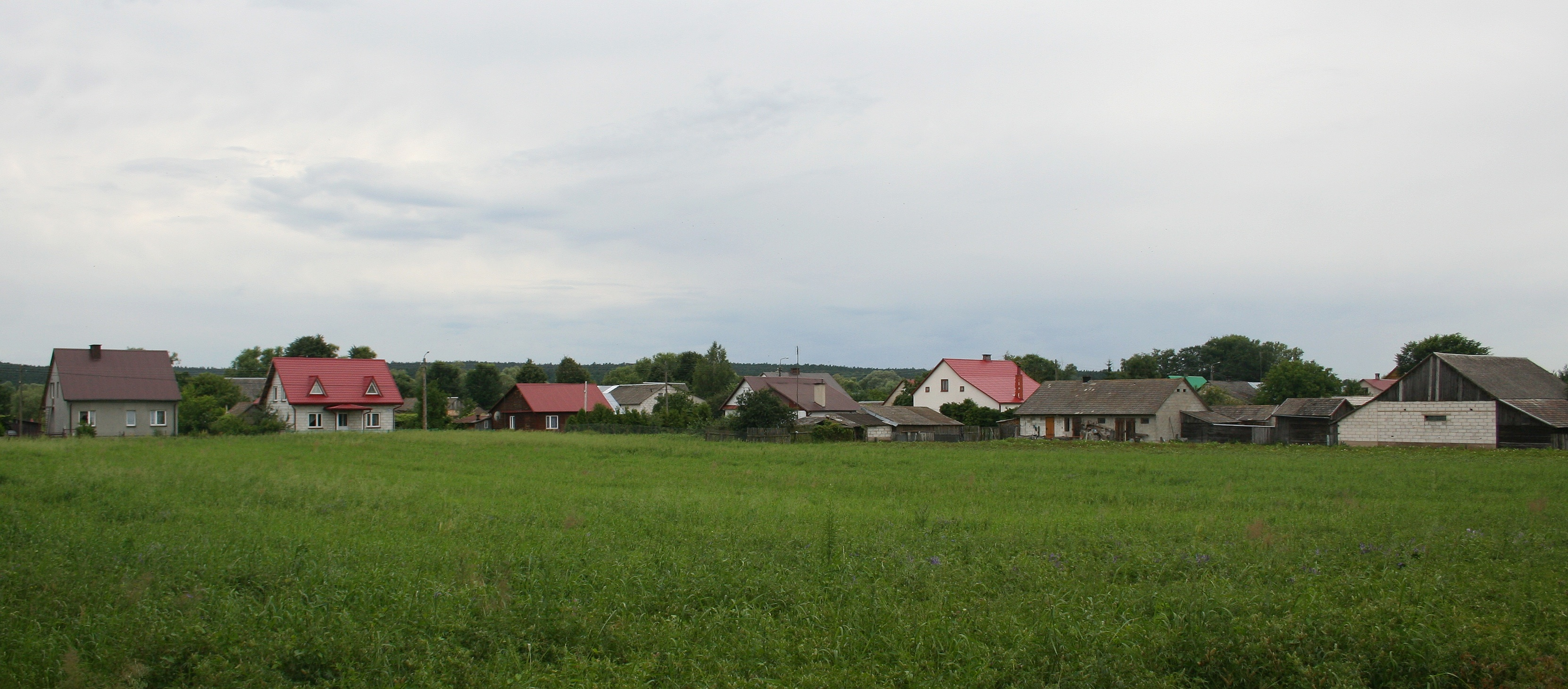

- Location within Poland
- Coordinates: 52°21′N 23°0′E
- Country: Poland
- Voivodeship: Podlaskie
- County: Siemiatycze
- Gmina: Mielnik

Osłowo [ɔˈswɔvɔ] is a village in the administrative district of Gmina Mielnik, within Siemiatycze County, Podlaskie Voivodeship, in north-eastern Poland, close to the border with Belarus.

According to the 1921 census, the village was inhabited by 114 people, among whom 15 were Roman Catholic, 90 Orthodox, and 9 Mosaic. At the same time, 105 inhabitants declared Polish nationality, 9 Jewish. There were 20 residential buildings in the village.
