= Maćkowicze =

- Village
- Location within Poland
- Coordinates: 52°23′N 22°55′E
- Country: Poland
- Voivodeship: Podlaskie
- County: Siemiatycze
- Gmina: Mielnik
- Population: 270

Maćkowicze [mat͡ɕkɔˈvʲit͡ʂɛ] is a village in the administrative district of Gmina Mielnik, within Siemiatycze County, Podlaskie Voivodeship, in north-eastern Poland, close to the border with Belarus.
