= Poręby, Podlaskie Voivodeship =

Poręby
- Village
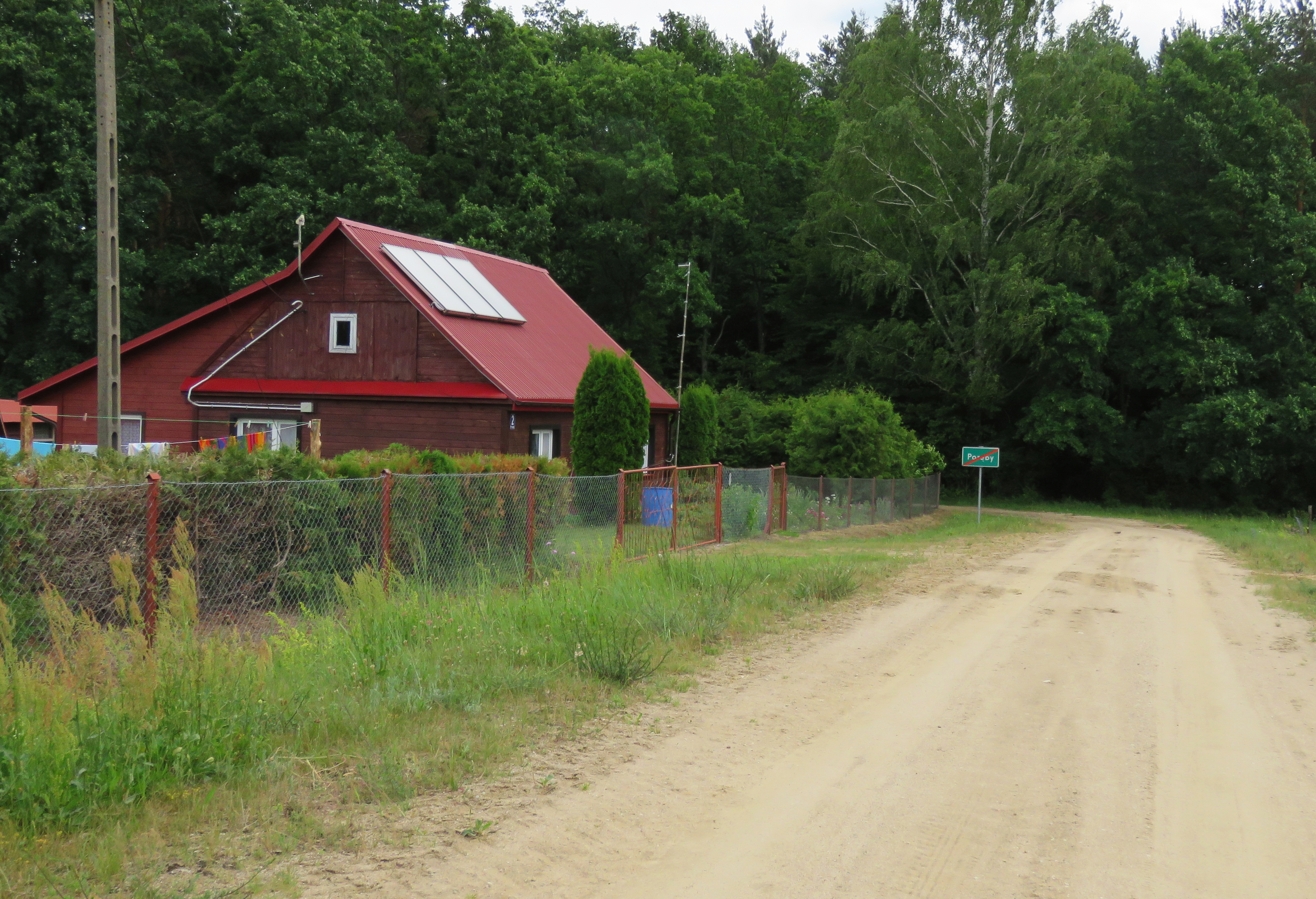
- Street of Poręby, Podlaskie Voivodeship

- Location within Poland
- Coordinates: 52°20′49″N 23°06′18″E
- Country: Poland
- Voivodeship: Podlaskie
- County: Siemiatycze
- Gmina: Mielnik

Poręby [pɔˈrɛmbɨ] is a village in the administrative district of Gmina Mielnik, within Siemiatycze County, Podlaskie Voivodeship, in north-eastern Poland, close to the border with Belarus.
