= Wilanowo, Podlaskie Voivodeship =

Wilanowo
- Village
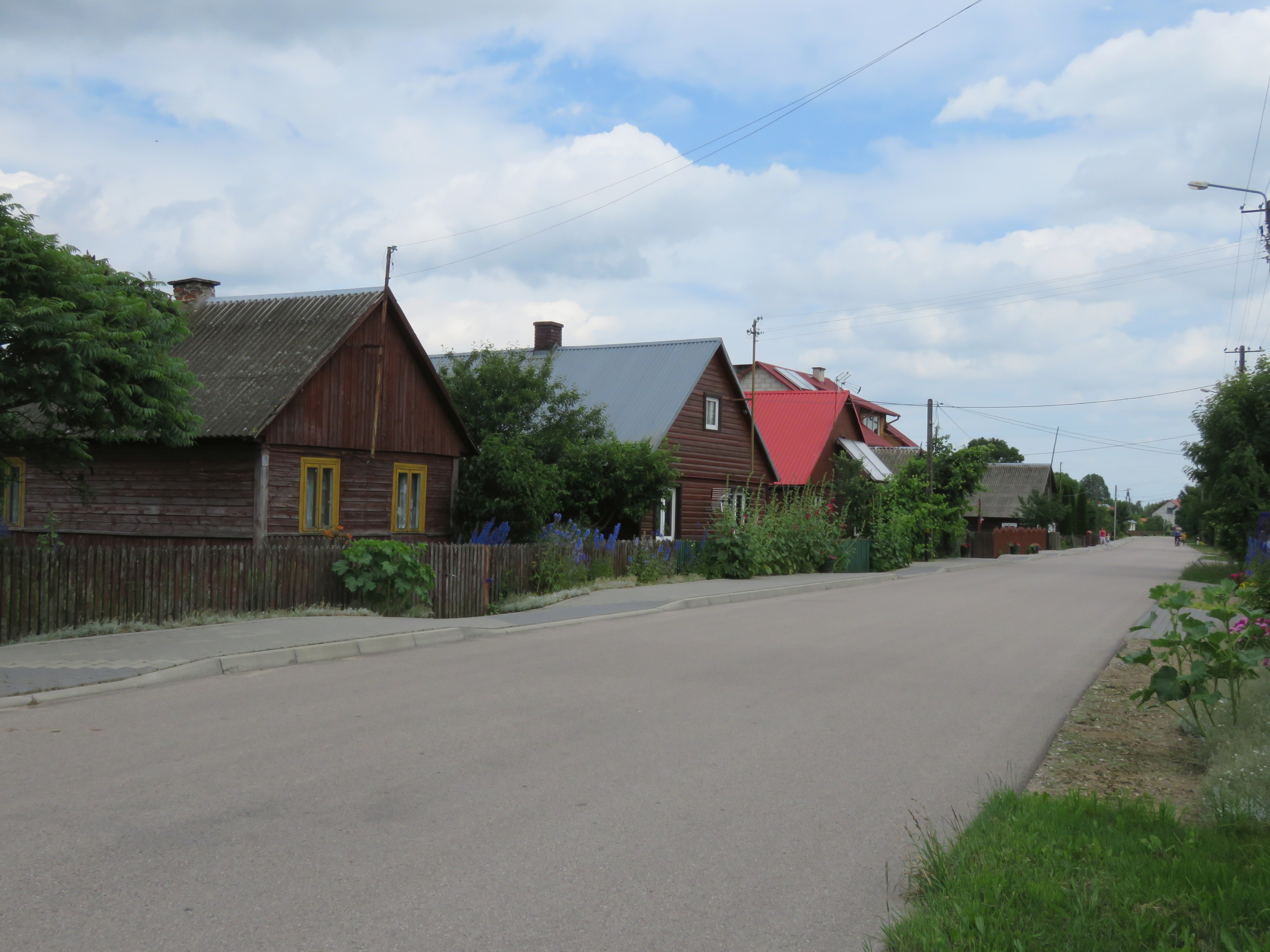

- Location within Poland
- Coordinates: 52°23′N 23°12′E
- Country: Poland
- Voivodeship: Podlaskie
- County: Siemiatycze
- Gmina: Mielnik

Wilanowo [vʲilaˈnɔvɔ] is a village in the administrative district of Gmina Mielnik, within Siemiatycze County, Podlaskie Voivodeship, in north-eastern Poland, close to the border with Belarus.
