= Sutno =

- Village
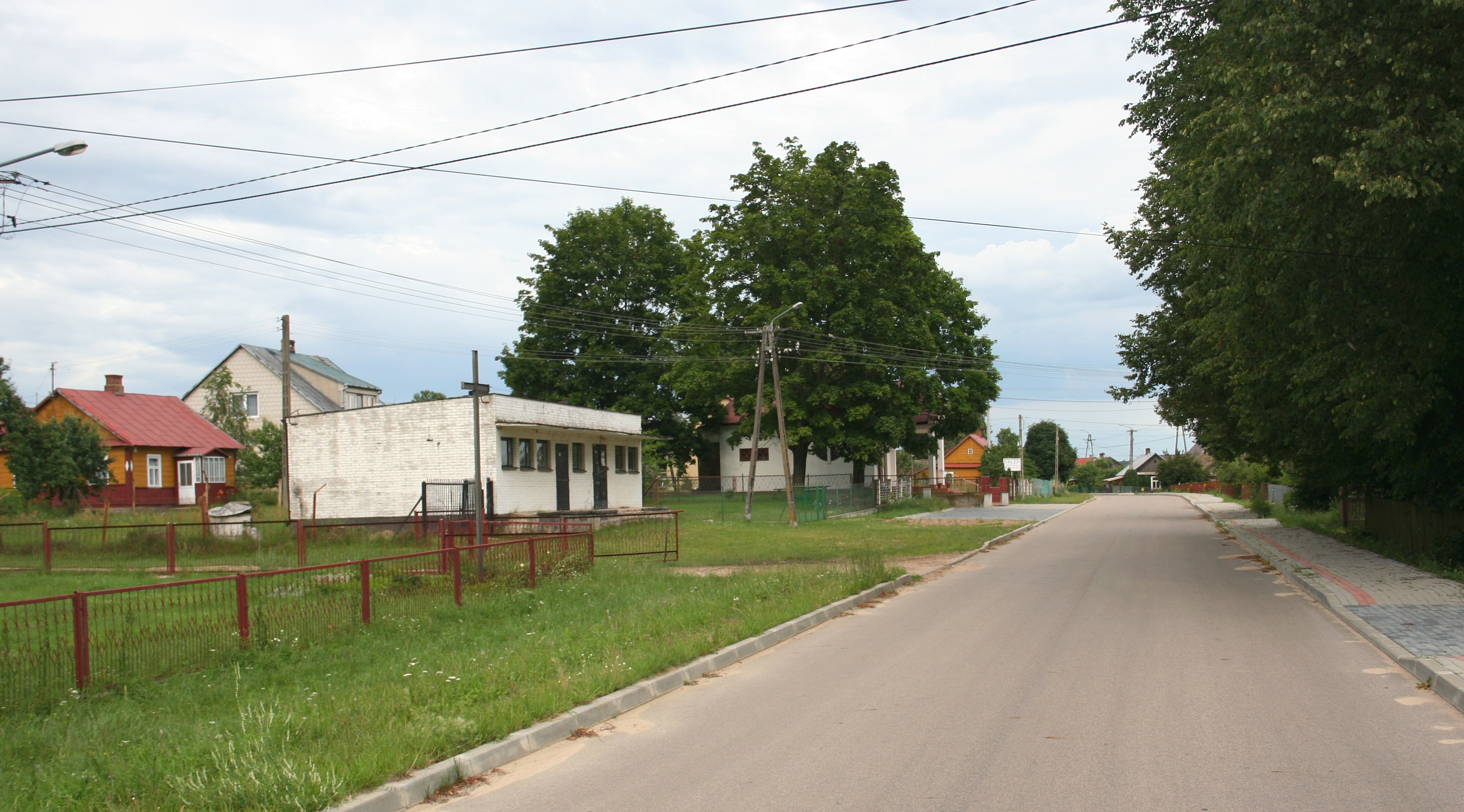

- Location within Poland
- Coordinates: 52°19′N 23°7′E
- Country: Poland
- Voivodeship: Podlaskie
- County: Siemiatycze
- Gmina: Mielnik
- Time zone: UTC+1 (CET)
  - Summer (DST): UTC+2 (CEST)
- Vehicle registration: BSI

Sutno [ˈsutnɔ] is a village in the administrative district of Gmina Mielnik, within Siemiatycze County, Podlaskie Voivodeship, in eastern Poland, close to the border with Belarus.

It is situated on the Bug River.

== History ==
Following the joint German-Soviet invasion of Poland, which started World War II in September 1939, the village was first occupied by the Soviet Union until 1941, and then by Germany until 1944. In 1941, the Germans carried out a massacre of 19 local men (see Nazi crimes against the Polish nation).
