= Końskie Góry =

- Village
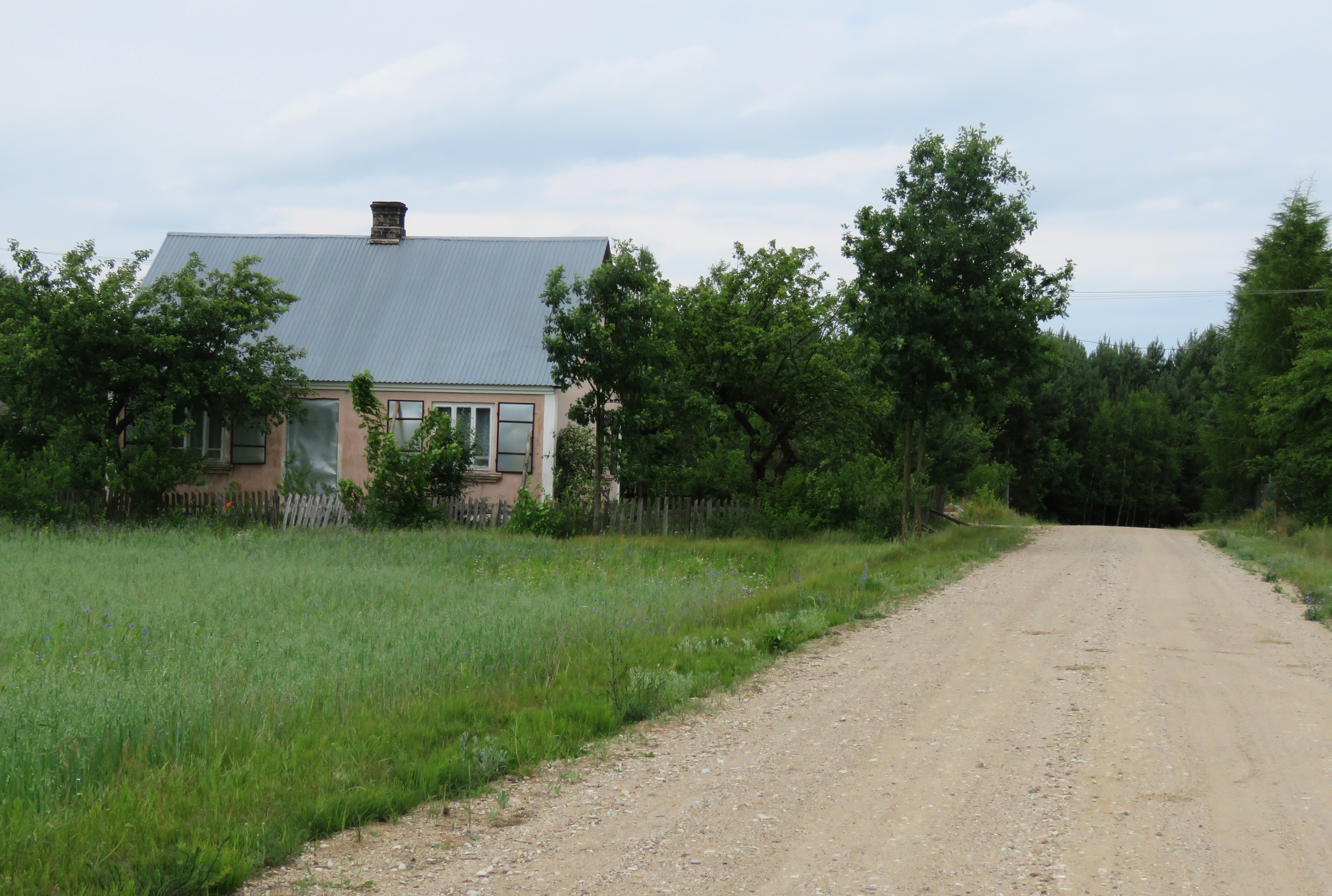
- Houses by the unpaved road in Końskie Góry

- Location within Poland
- Coordinates: 52°23′57″N 23°01′28″E
- Country: Poland
- Voivodeship: Podlaskie
- County: Siemiatycze
- Gmina: Mielnik

Końskie Góry [ˈkɔɲskʲɛ ˈɡurɨ] is a village in the administrative district of Gmina Mielnik, within Siemiatycze County, Podlaskie Voivodeship, in north-eastern Poland, close to the border with Belarus.
