= Mętna =

- Village
- Location within Poland
- Coordinates: 52°21′N 23°8′E
- Country: Poland
- Voivodeship: Podlaskie
- County: Siemiatycze
- Gmina: Mielnik
- Population (2021): 45

Mętna [ˈmɛntna] is a village in the administrative district of Gmina Mielnik, within Siemiatycze County, Podlaskie Voivodeship, in north-eastern Poland, close to the border with Belarus. As of 2021, it has a population of 45.
