= Grabowiec, Siemiatycze County =

Grabowiec
- Village
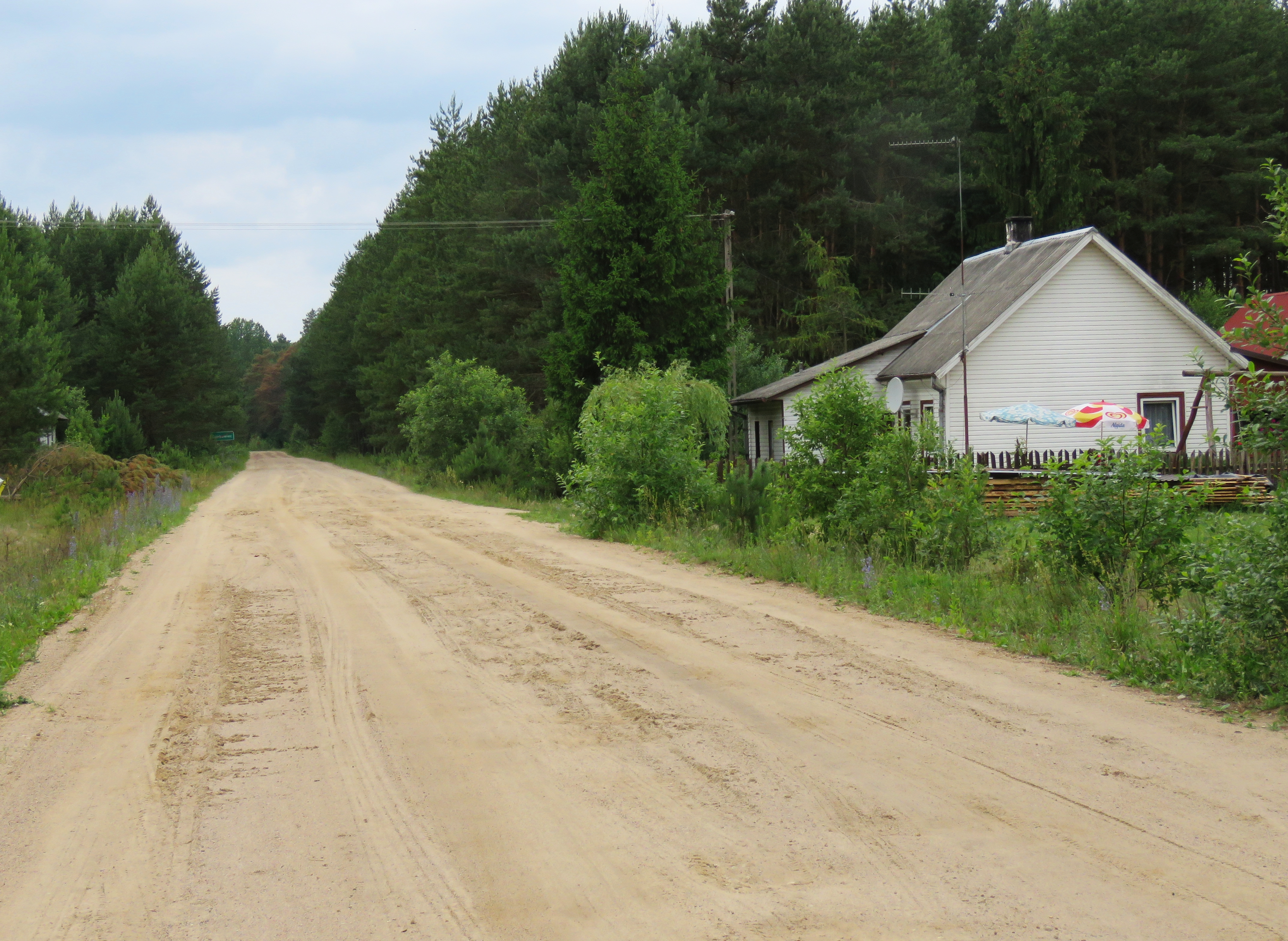
- Road in Grabowiec

- Location within Poland
- Coordinates: 52°20′57″N 23°03′12″E
- Country: Poland
- Voivodeship: Podlaskie
- County: Siemiatycze
- Gmina: Mielnik

Grabowiec ([ɡraˈbɔvʲɛt͡s]; Belarusian (Taraškievica): Гра́бавец, Hrábavets’) is a village in the administrative district of Gmina Mielnik, within Siemiatycze County, Podlaskie Voivodeship, in north-eastern Poland, close to the border with Belarus.
