= Homoty =

- Village
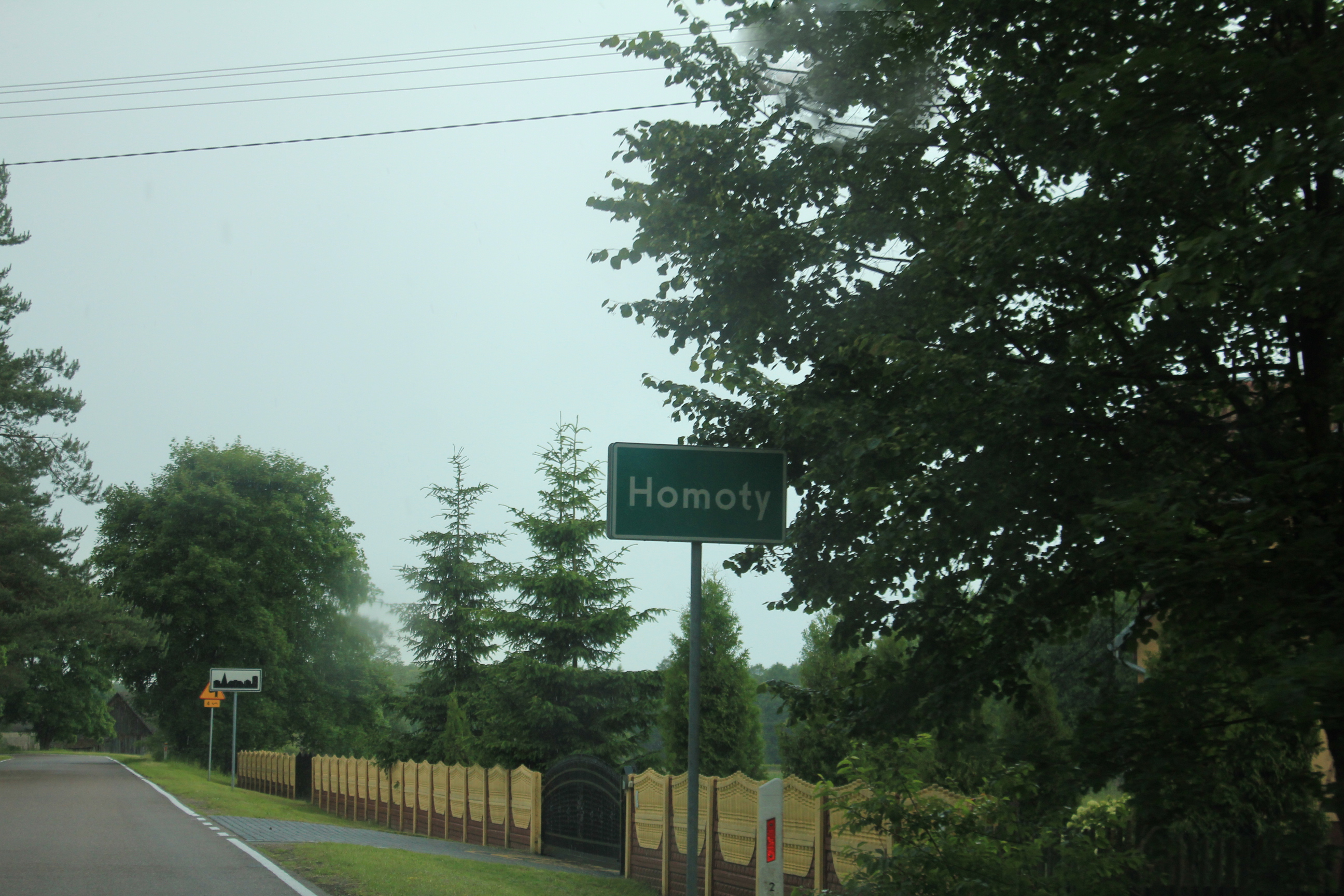

- Location within Poland
- Coordinates: 52°24′N 22°58′E
- Country: Poland
- Voivodeship: Podlaskie
- County: Siemiatycze
- Gmina: Mielnik

Homoty [xɔˈmɔtɨ] is a village in the administrative district of Gmina Mielnik, within Siemiatycze County, Podlaskie Voivodeship, in north-eastern Poland, close to the border with Belarus.

According to the 1921 census, the village was inhabited by 42 people, among whom 12 were Roman Catholic, 28 Orthodox, and 5 Mosaic. At the same time, all inhabitants declared Polish nationality. There were 92 residential buildings in the village.
