= Radziwiłłówka =

- Village
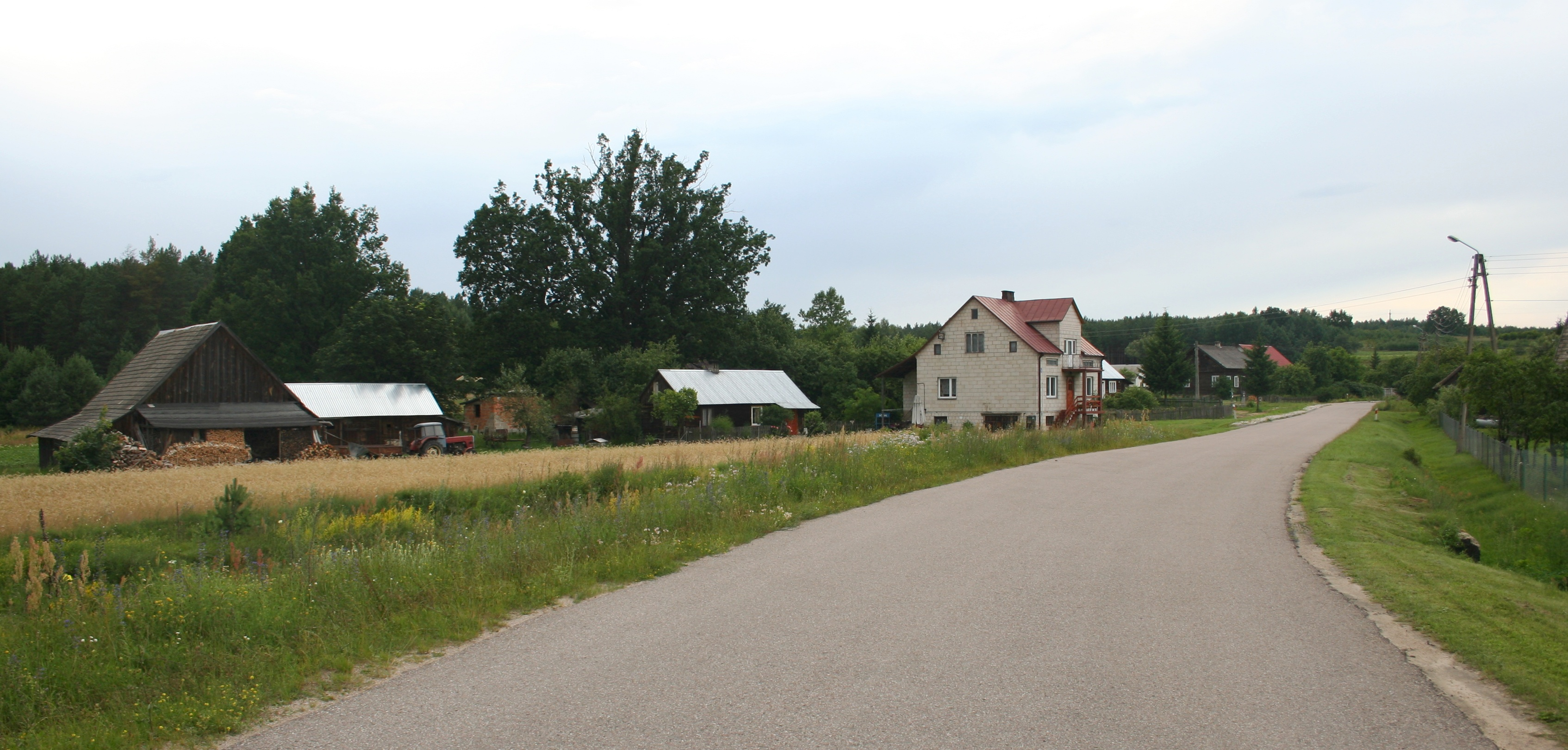

- Location within Poland
- Coordinates: 52°23′N 23°2′E
- Country: Poland
- Voivodeship: Podlaskie
- County: Siemiatycze
- Gmina: Mielnik
- Time zone: UTC+1 (CET)
  - Summer (DST): UTC+2 (CEST)

Radziwiłłówka [rad͡ʑiviu̯ˈwufka] is a village in the administrative district of Gmina Mielnik, within Siemiatycze County, Podlaskie Voivodeship, in north-eastern Poland, close to the border with Belarus.

== History ==
Three Polish citizens were murdered by Nazi Germany in the village during World War II.
