= Gmina Mielnik =

Gmina Mielnik Mielnik Commune
- Gmina
- Interactive map of Gmina Mielnik
- Coordinates (Mielnik): 52°20′N 23°3′E
- Country: Poland
- Voivodeship: Podlaskie
- County: Siemiatycze
- Seat: Mielnik

Area
  - Total: 196.24 km^{2} (75.77 sq mi)

Population (2006)
  - Total: 2,696
  - Density: 13.74/km^{2} (35.58/sq mi)
- Website: http://www.mielnik.com.pl/

Gmina Mielnik is a rural gmina (administrative district) in Siemiatycze County, Podlaskie Voivodeship, in north-eastern Poland, on the border with Belarus. Its seat is the village of Mielnik, which lies approximately 17 kilometres (11 mi) south-east of Siemiatycze and 88 km (55 mi) south of the regional capital Białystok.

The gmina covers an area of 196.24 square kilometres (75.8 sq mi), and as of 2006 its total population is 2,696.

== Villages ==
Gmina Mielnik contains the villages and settlements of Adamowo-Zastawa, Grabowiec, Homoty, Końskie Góry, Koterka, Kudlicze, Maćkowicze, Mętna, Mielnik, Moszczona Królewska, Niemirów, Oksiutycze, Osłowo, Pawłowicze, Poręby, Radziwiłłówka, Sutno, Tokary, Wajków and Wilanowo.

== Neighbouring gminas ==
Gmina Mielnik is bordered by the gminas of Konstantynów, Nurzec-Stacja, Sarnaki and Siemiatycze. It also borders Belarus.
