= Koterka =

- Village
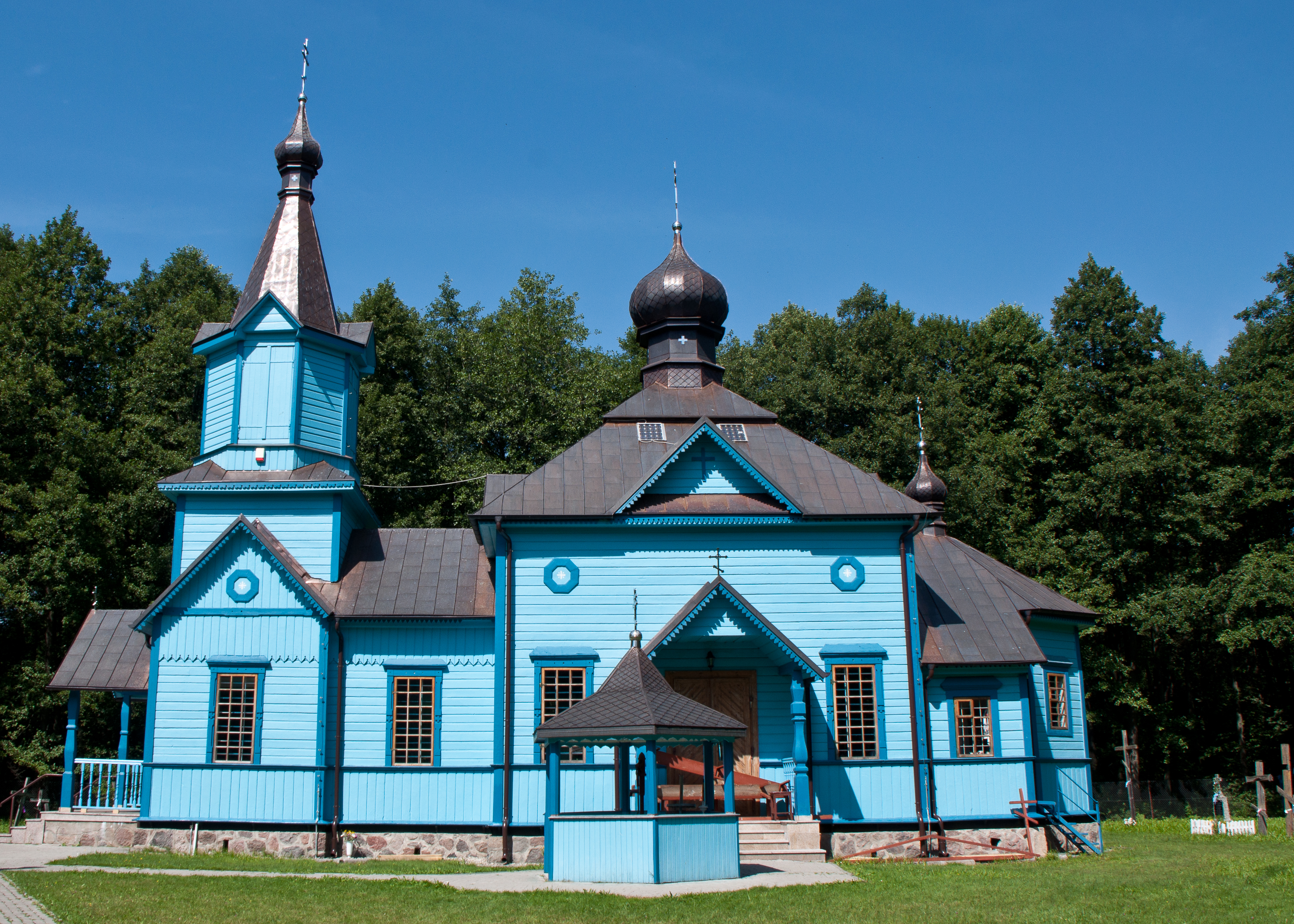
- Church in Koterka, August 2012

- Location within Poland
- Coordinates: 52°21′20″N 23°12′19″E
- Country: Poland
- Voivodeship: Podlaskie
- County: Siemiatycze
- Gmina: Mielnik

Koterka [kɔˈtɛrka] is a village in the administrative district of Gmina Mielnik, within Siemiatycze County, Podlaskie Voivodeship, in north-eastern Poland, close to the border with Belarus.
