= Tokary, Podlaskie Voivodeship =

Tokary
- Village
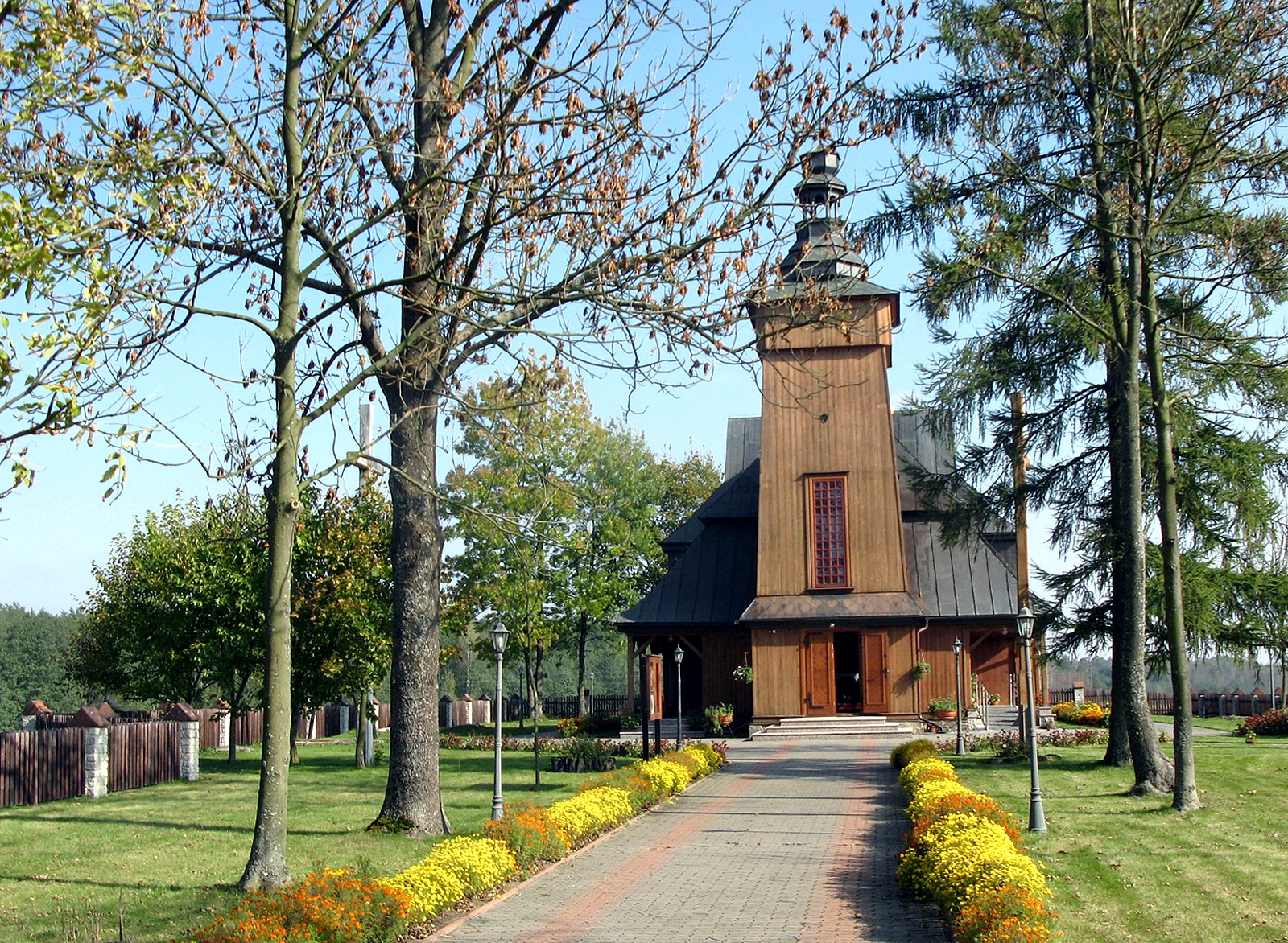

- Location within Poland
- Coordinates: 52°23′01″N 23°15′25″E
- Country: Poland
- Voivodeship: Podlaskie
- County: Siemiatycze
- Gmina: Mielnik
- Population: 230

Tokary [tɔˈkarɨ] is a village in the administrative district of Gmina Mielnik, within Siemiatycze County, Podlaskie Voivodeship, in north-eastern Poland, close to the border with Belarus.
