= Koce Borowe =

- Village
- Location within Poland
- Coordinates: 52°42′56″N 22°39′52″E
- Country: Poland
- Voivodeship: Podlaskie
- County: Bielsk
- Gmina: Rudka

Koce Borowe [ˈkɔt͡sɛ bɔˈrɔvɛ] is a village in the administrative district of Gmina Rudka, within Bielsk County, Podlaskie Voivodeship, in north-eastern Poland.
