= Gmina Rudka =

Gmina Rudka Rudka Commune
- Gmina
- Coat of arms

- Location within Poland
- Coordinates (Rudka): 52°43′42″N 22°43′50″E
- Country: Poland
- Voivodeship: Podlaskie
- County: Bielsk
- Seat: Rudka

Government
  - Mayor: Andrzej Anusiewicz

Area
  - Total: 70.21 km^{2} (27.11 sq mi)

Population (2007)
  - Total: 2,170
  - Density: 30.9/km^{2} (80.0/sq mi)
- Time zone: UTC+1 (CET)
  - Summer (DST): UTC+2 (CEST)
- Postal code: 17-123
- Area code: +48 085
- Car plates: BBI
- Website: http://bip.ug.rudka.wrotapodlasia.pl/

Gmina Rudka [ˈrudka] is a rural gmina (Polish:gmina wiejska) in Bielsk County, Podlaskie Voivodeship. It is located in north-eastern Poland.

== Geography ==
Gmina Rudka is located in the geographical region of Europe known as the Wysoczyzny Podlasko – Bialoruskie (English: Podlaskie and Belarus Plateau) and the mezoregion known as the Równina Bielska (English: Bielska Plain).

The gmina covers an area of 70.21 square kilometres (27.1 sq mi).

=== Location ===
It is located approximately:

- 132 kilometres (82.0 mi) north-east of Warsaw, the capital of Poland
- 53 kilometres (32.9 mi) south-west of Białystok, the capital of the Podlaskie Voivodeship
- 32 kilometres (19.9 mi) west of Bielsk Podlaski, the seat of Bielsk County

=== Climate ===
The region has a continental climate which is characterized by high temperatures during summer and long and frosty winters . The average amount of rainfall during the year exceeds 550 millimetres (21.7 in).

=== Rivers ===
Two rivers pass through the Gmina:

- The Nurzec River, a tributary of the Bug River
- The Siennica River, a tributary of the Nurzec River

== Demographics ==
Detailed data as of 31 December 2007:

	Total		Women		Men	
Unit	Number	%	Number	%	Number	%
Population	2,170	100	1,058	48.8	1,112	51.2
Population Density (persons/km²)	30.9		15.1		15.8	

== Municipal government ==
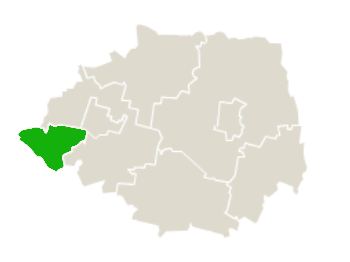
Gmina Rudka in Bielsk County

Its seat is the village of Rudka.

=== Executive branch ===
The chief executive of the government is the mayor (Polish: wójt).

=== Legislative branch ===
The legislative portion of the government is the Council (Polish: Rada) comprising the President (Polish: Przewodniczący), the Vice-President (Polish: Wiceprzewodniczący) and thirteen councilors.

=== Villages ===
The following villages are contained within the gmina:

Józefin, Karp, Koce Borowe, Niemyje-Jarnąty, Niemyje-Skłody, Niemyje-Ząbki, Nowe Niemyje, Rudka, Stare Niemyje.

=== Neighbouring political subdivisions ===
Gmina Rudka is bordered by the town of Brańsk and by the Gminy of Brańsk, Ciechanowiec, Grodzisk and Klukowo.

== Transport ==
=== Roads and highways ===
A Voivodeship Road passes through Gmina Rudka:

- Voivodeship Road 681 DW 681 - Roszki-Wodźki - Łapy - Brańsk - Rudka - Ciechanowiec

== Local attractions ==
- Ossoliński Palace - eighteenth century baroque architecture. Built in 1763, rebuilt in the years 1913-1914, the so-called 'New palace " of about 1930. Orangery brick from the second half of the eighteenth century, brick and wood buildings and czworaki from the nineteenth and twentieth in, park, 1763;
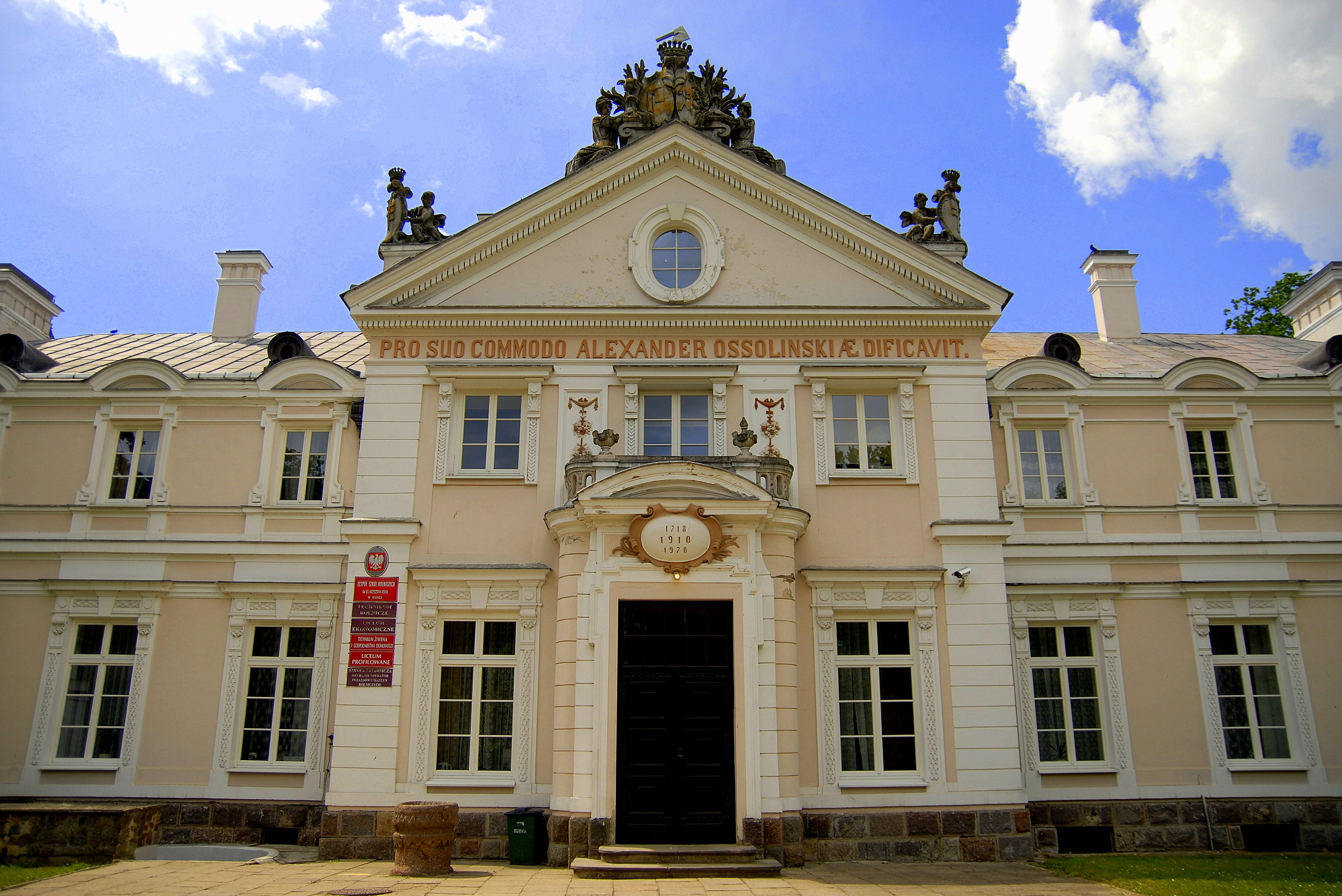
The Ossoliński Palace in Rudka

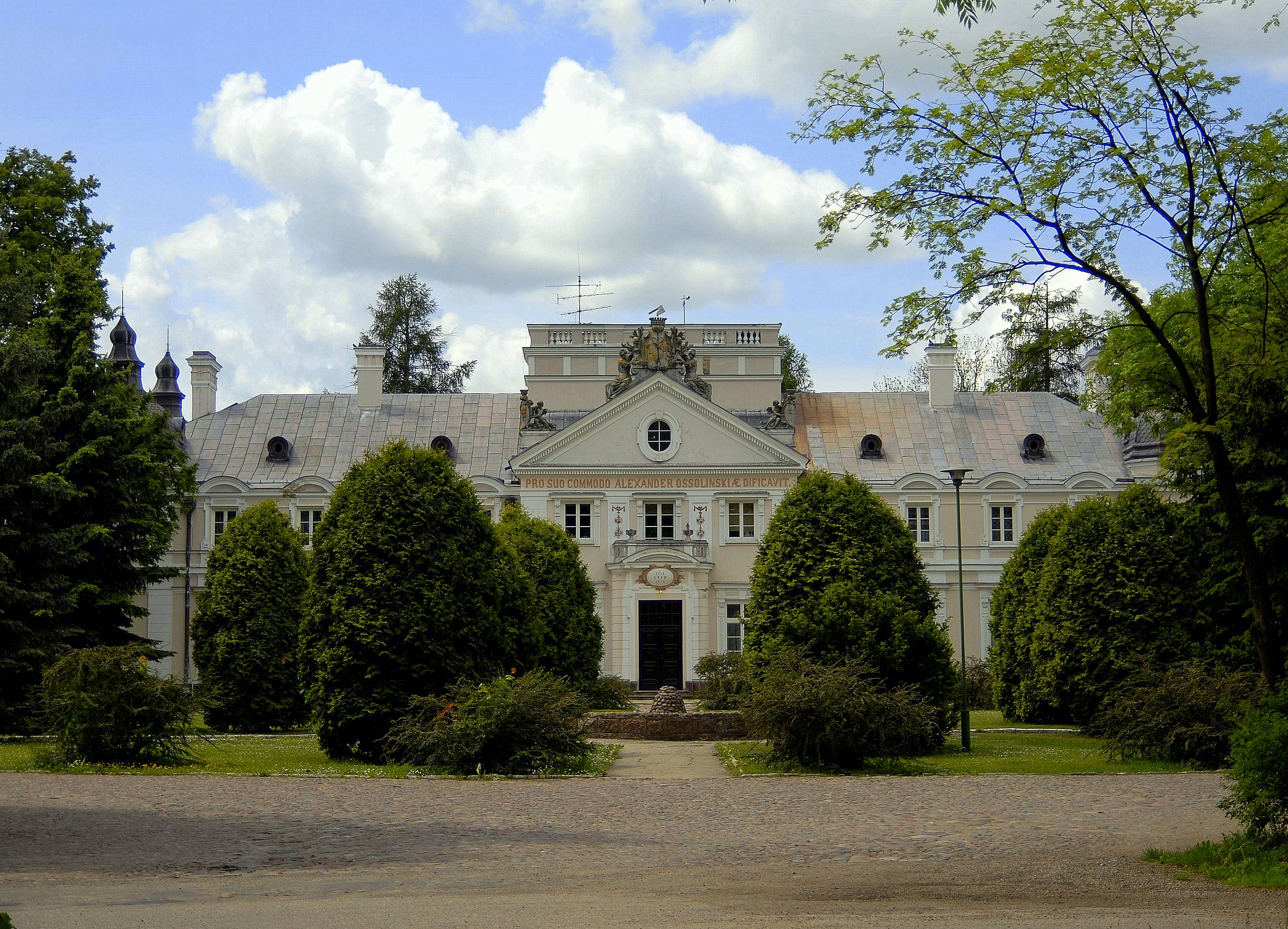
The Ossoliński Palace in Rudka

== Nearby attractions ==
- Sanktuarium Matki Bożej Pojedniania w Hodyszewie (Our Lady of Hodyszewo Sanctuary) in Hodyzewo - 18 kilometres (11.2 mi) northeast
