= Nowe Niemyje =

- Village
- Location within Poland
- Coordinates: 52°43′24″N 22°40′41″E
- Country: Poland
- Voivodeship: Podlaskie
- County: Bielsk
- Gmina: Rudka

Nowe Niemyje [ˈnɔvɛ ɲɛˈmɨjɛ] is a village in the administrative district of Gmina Rudka, within Bielsk County, Podlaskie Voivodeship, in north-eastern Poland.
