= Niemyje-Jarnąty =

Village in Gmina Rudka, Poland

- Village
- Location within Poland
- Coordinates: 52°43′36″N 22°39′56″E
- Country: Poland
- Voivodeship: Podlaskie
- County: Bielsk
- Gmina: Rudka

Niemyje-Jarnąty [ɲɛˈmɨjɛ jarˈnɔntɨ] is a village in the administrative district of Gmina Rudka, within Bielsk County, Podlaskie Voivodeship, in north-eastern Poland.
