= Józefin =

Józefin may refer to the following places:

- Józefin, Gmina Chełm in Lublin Voivodeship (east Poland)
- Józefin, Gmina Kamień in Lublin Voivodeship (east Poland)
- Józefin, Gmina Rejowiec Fabryczny in Lublin Voivodeship (east Poland)
- Józefin, Hrubieszów County in Lublin Voivodeship (east Poland)
- Józefin, Gmina Urzędów in Lublin Voivodeship (east Poland)
- Józefin, Gmina Zakrzówek in Lublin Voivodeship (east Poland)
- Józefin, Podlaskie Voivodeship (north-east Poland)
- Józefin, Bielsk County in Podlaskie Voivodeship (north-east Poland)
- Józefin, Gmina Ujazd in Łódź Voivodeship (central Poland)
- Józefin, Gmina Żelechlinek in Łódź Voivodeship (central Poland)
- Józefin, Gmina Halinów in Masovian Voivodeship (east-central Poland)
- Józefin, Gmina Jakubów in Masovian Voivodeship (east-central Poland)
- Józefin, Gmina Korczew in Masovian Voivodeship (east-central Poland)
- Józefin, Gmina Kotuń in Masovian Voivodeship (east-central Poland)
- Józefin, Wołomin County in Masovian Voivodeship (east-central Poland)
- Józefin, Greater Poland Voivodeship (west-central Poland)
- Józefin, West Pomeranian Voivodeship (north-west Poland)
