= Karp, Podlaskie Voivodeship =

Karp
- Village
- Location within Poland
- Coordinates: 52°45′N 22°43′E
- Country: Poland
- Voivodeship: Podlaskie
- County: Bielsk
- Gmina: Rudka

Karp [karp] is a village in the administrative district of Gmina Rudka, within Bielsk County, Podlaskie Voivodeship, in north-eastern Poland.
