= Niemyje-Skłody =

- Village
- Location within Poland
- Coordinates: 52°43′37″N 22°41′12″E
- Country: Poland
- Voivodeship: Podlaskie
- County: Bielsk
- Gmina: Rudka
- Population: 60

Niemyje-Skłody [ɲɛˈmɨjɛ ˈskwɔdɨ] is a village in the administrative district of Gmina Rudka, within Bielsk County, Podlaskie Voivodeship, in north-eastern Poland.
