= Niemyje-Ząbki =

- Village
- Location within Poland
- Coordinates: 52°44′24″N 22°40′35″E
- Country: Poland
- Voivodeship: Podlaskie
- County: Bielsk
- Gmina: Rudka
- Population: 80

Niemyje-Ząbki [ɲɛˈmɨjɛ ˈzɔmpki] is a village in the administrative district of Gmina Rudka, within Bielsk County, Podlaskie Voivodeship, in north-eastern Poland.
