= Stare Niemyje, Podlaskie Voivodeship =

Stare Niemyje
- Village
- Location within Poland
- Coordinates: 52°42′58″N 22°40′06″E
- Country: Poland
- Voivodeship: Podlaskie
- County: Bielsk
- Gmina: Rudka

Stare Niemyje [ˈstarɛ ɲɛˈmɨjɛ] is a village in the administrative district of Gmina Rudka, within Bielsk County, Podlaskie Voivodeship, in north-eastern Poland.
