= Rudka, Bielsk County =

Rudka
- Village
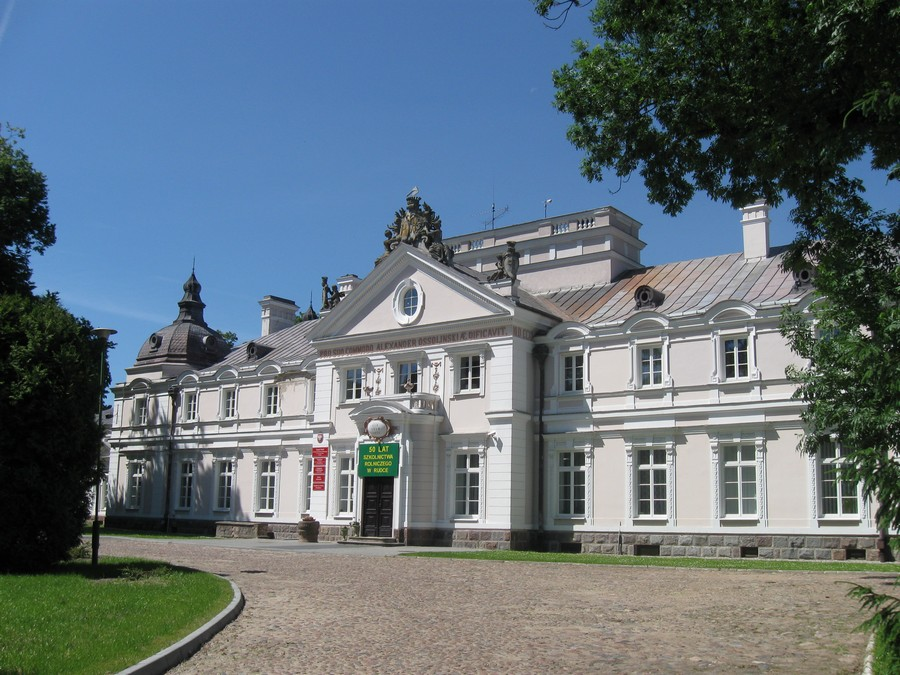
- Ossoliński Palace

- Location within Poland
- Coordinates: 52°43′42″N 22°43′50″E
- Country: Poland
- Voivodeship: Podlaskie
- County: Bielsk
- Gmina: Rudka

Population
  - Total: 1,400
- Time zone: UTC+1 (CET)
  - Summer (DST): UTC+2 (CEST)
- Vehicle registration: BBI
- Website: http://www.rudka.podlaskie.prv.pl/

Rudka [ˈrutka] is a village in Bielsk County, Podlaskie Voivodeship, in north-eastern Poland. It is the seat of the gmina (administrative district) called Gmina Rudka.

The local landmark is the Baroque Ossoliński Palace, built in 1763, rebuilt in 1913–1914, the so-called New Palace is from ca. 1930.

23 Polish citizens were murdered by Nazi Germany in the village during World War II.
