= Podlaskie Museum in Białystok =

Largest museum of Podlaskie Voivodeship

- Muzeum Podlaskie w Białymstoku
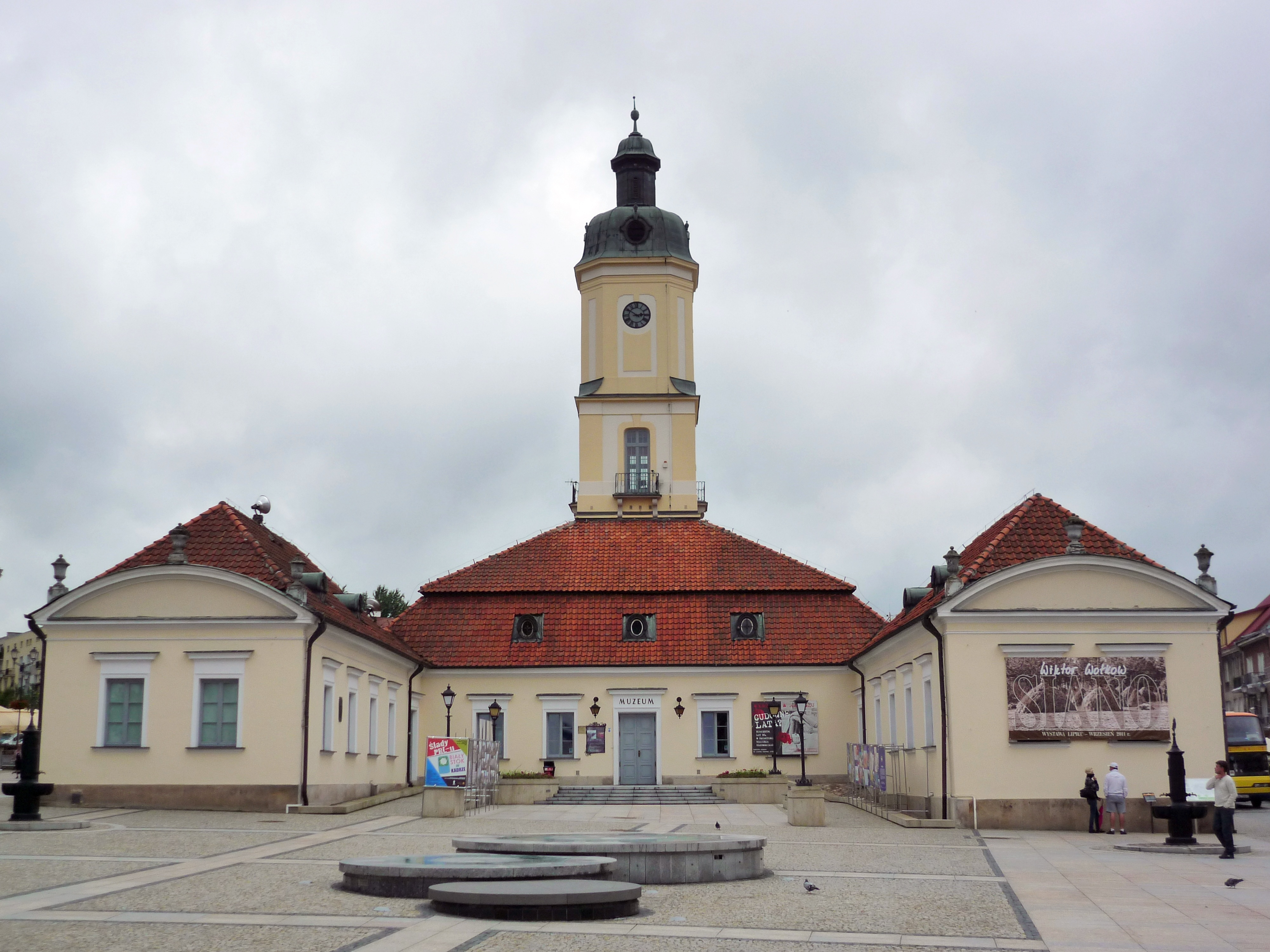
- Established: 1949
- Location: 10 Kościuszko Square, Białystok
- Coordinates: 53°07′27″N 23°09′31″E
- Website: muzeum.bialystok.pl

Podlaskie Museum in Białystok is a museum in Białystok in north-eastern Poland. It is the largest museum of Podlaskie Voivodeship.

== History ==
It was established in 1949 by the decree of the Ministry of Culture and Arts as the first regional museum in the history of the city.

Its site was the rebuilt right wing of the Branicki Palace. In March 1950, the museum was moved to the Branicki Guest Palace located at Kilińskiego Street. On 1 January 1952, the institution was nationalized, and the National Museum of Warsaw took supervision over it. On 27 July 1957, the Regional Museum gained the rank of a district museum and took charge of the regional museums in Łomża and Suwałki.

On 13 September 1958, the museum moved to the rebuilt town hall. Due to the expansion of the area, new workshops were established - next to the existing, historical and archaeological ones, in 1958 an art workshop was established, in 1962 an ethnographic workshop, and in 1965 a scientific and educational workshop.

In 1973, the museum developed rapidly, it was handed over to the palace in Choroszcz, where an interior exhibition was created. A Museum Point was also created in the refectory and chapel of the former Abbots' Palace in Supraśl. Two years later, the historical workshop moved from the guest palace at Kilińskiego Street to the historic Cytron Palace at Warszawska 37 Street. A new branch was established in Tykocin, based in the rebuilt synagogue and Talmudic house.

In 1982 and in the areas located in Wasilków on the road to Augustów, the Białystok Village Museum was established. In 1984, in the renovated town hall in Bielsk Podlaski a new branch of the museum was established. The turn of the century brought further name changes to the institutions: on 27 April 1998, at the State Museum in Białystok, and on 25 April 2000, it was renamed the Podlaskie Museum in Białystok.

From 1 January 2020, the Podlaskie Museum is co-run by the Ministry of Culture and National Heritage and the Podlaskie Voivodeship. A 10-year contract in this matter was signed on 17 December 2019.

== Collection highlights ==
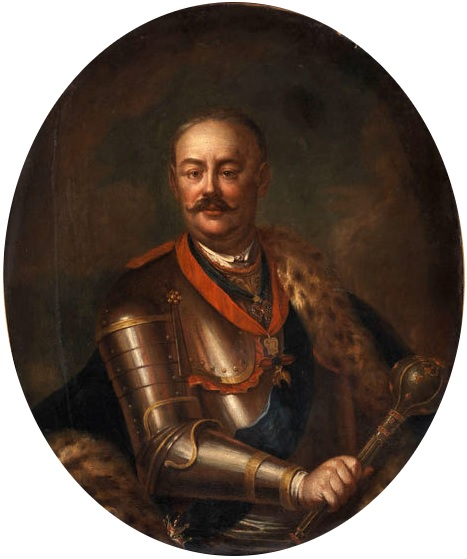
Jana Klemens Branicki

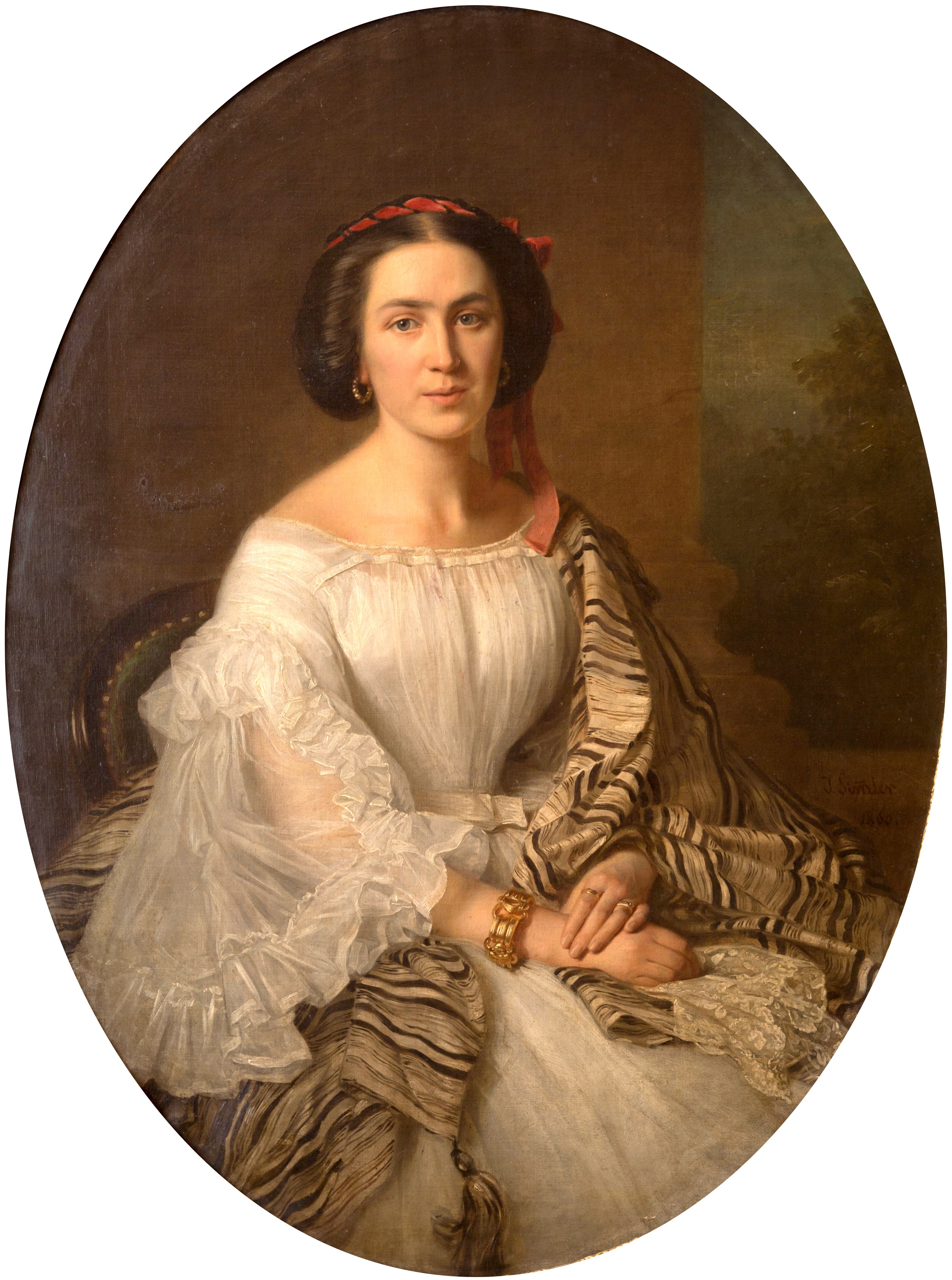
Józef Simmler Lucyna Karska

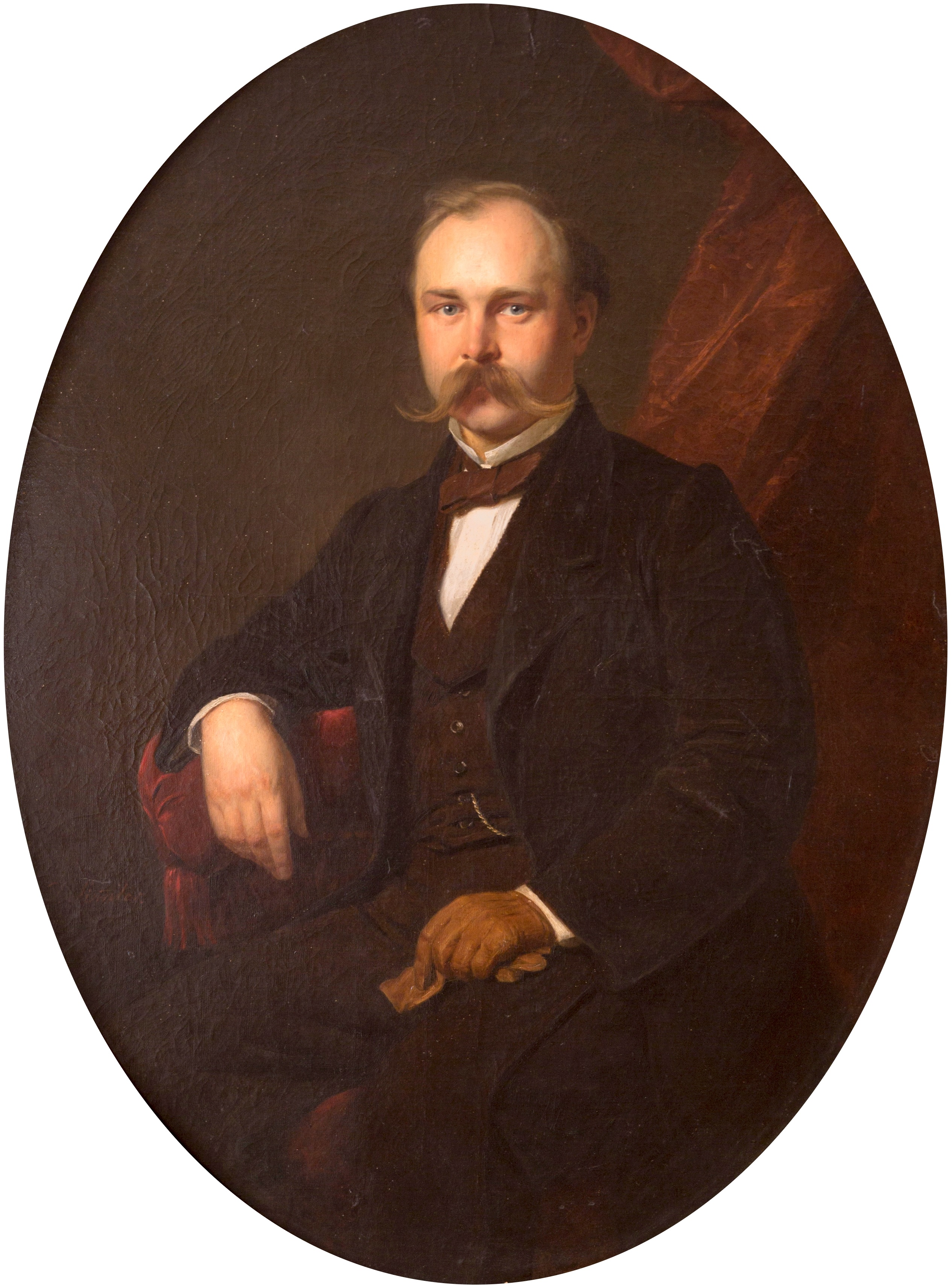
Józef Simmler August Karski

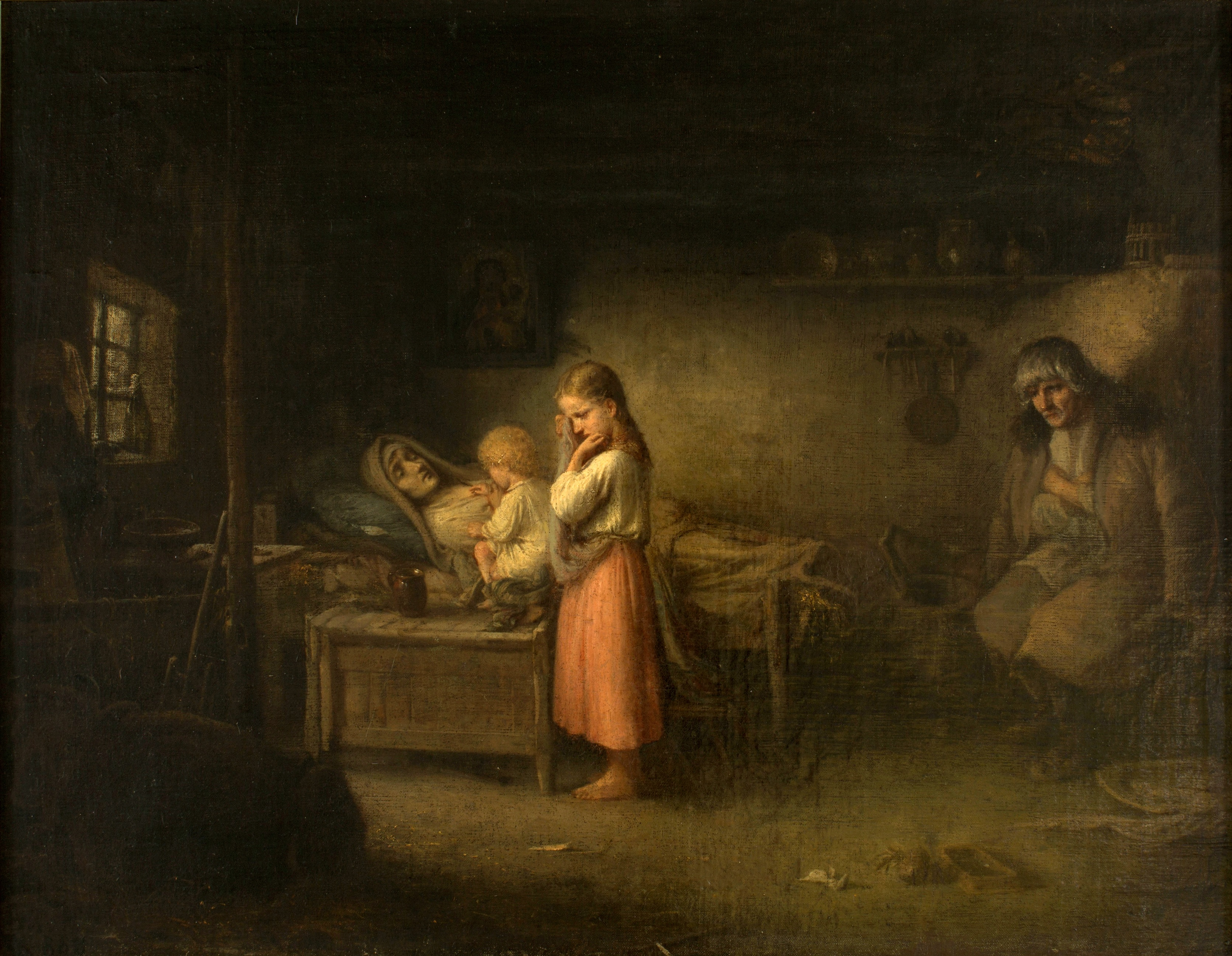
Aleksander Kotsis Matula died

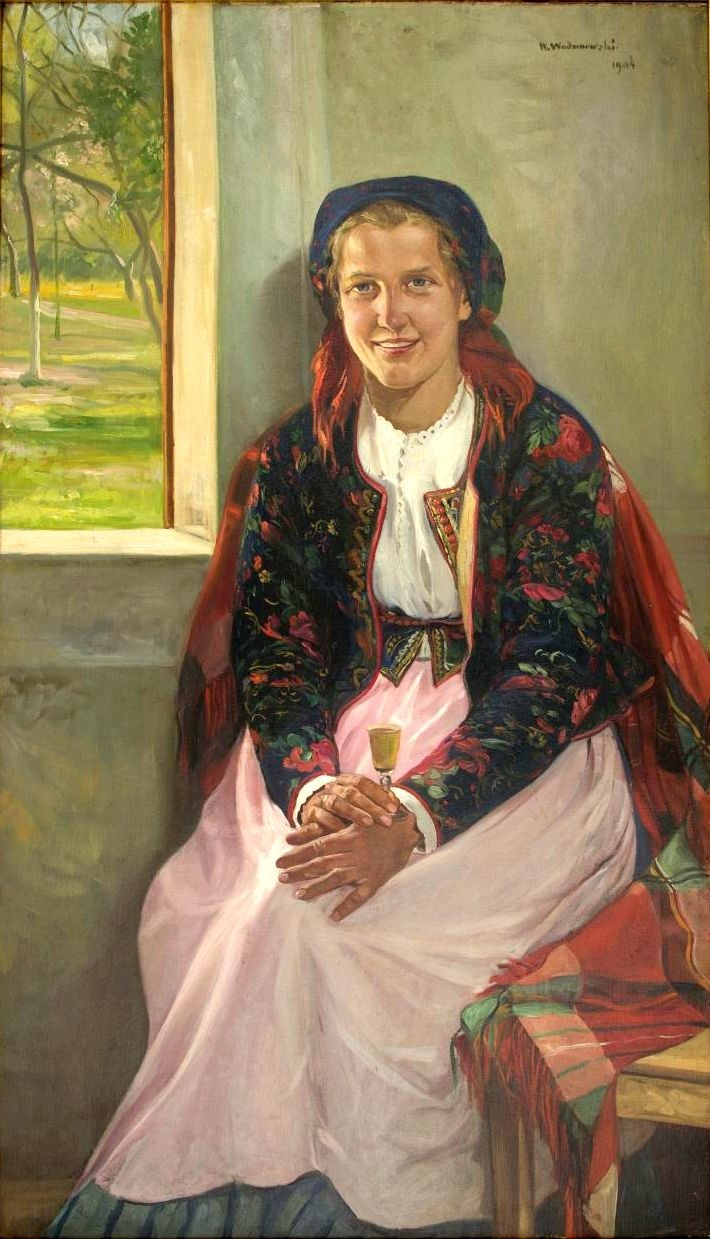
Wincenty Wodzinowski Portrait of a highlander

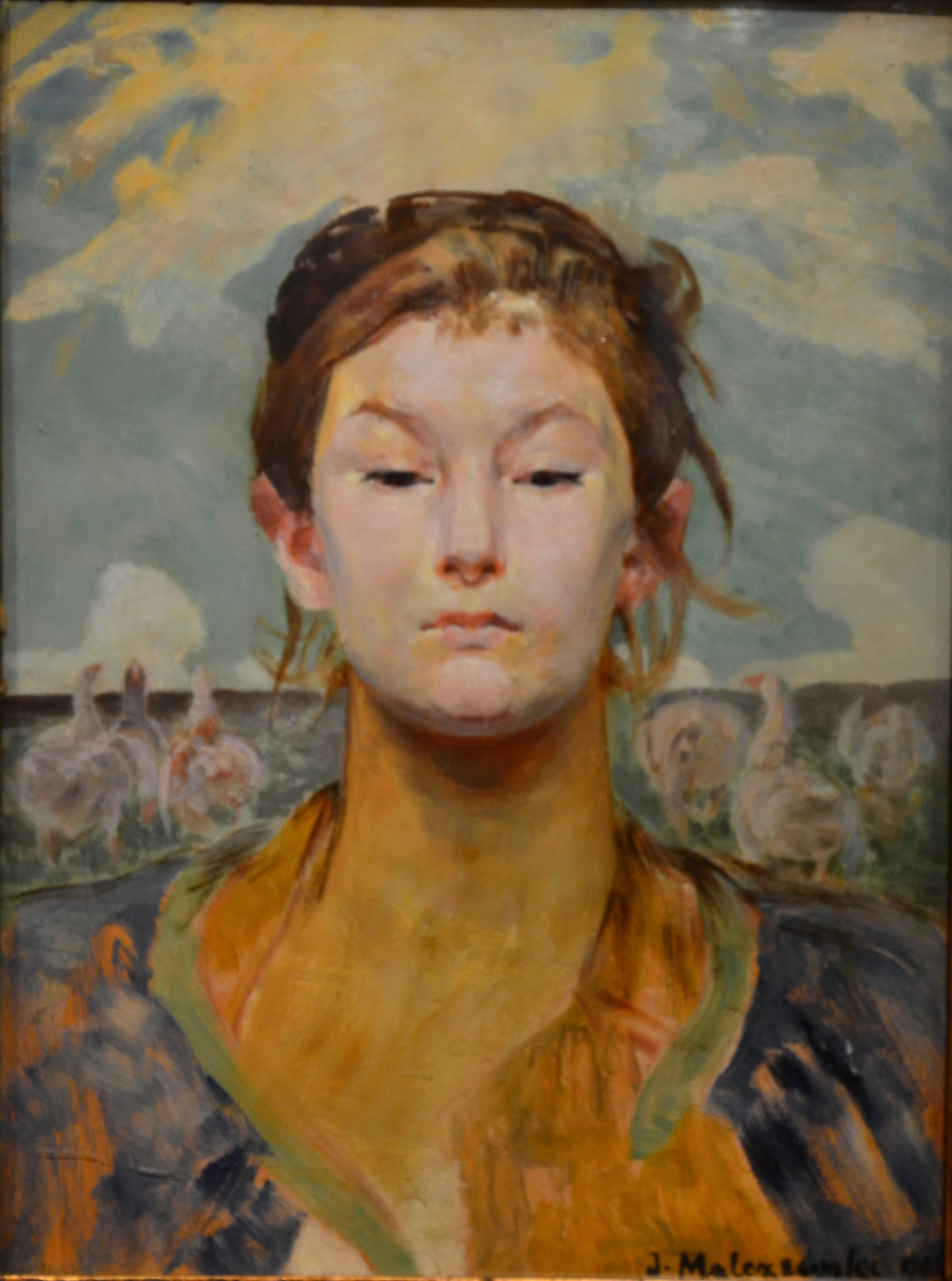
Jacek Malczewski Study of a girl

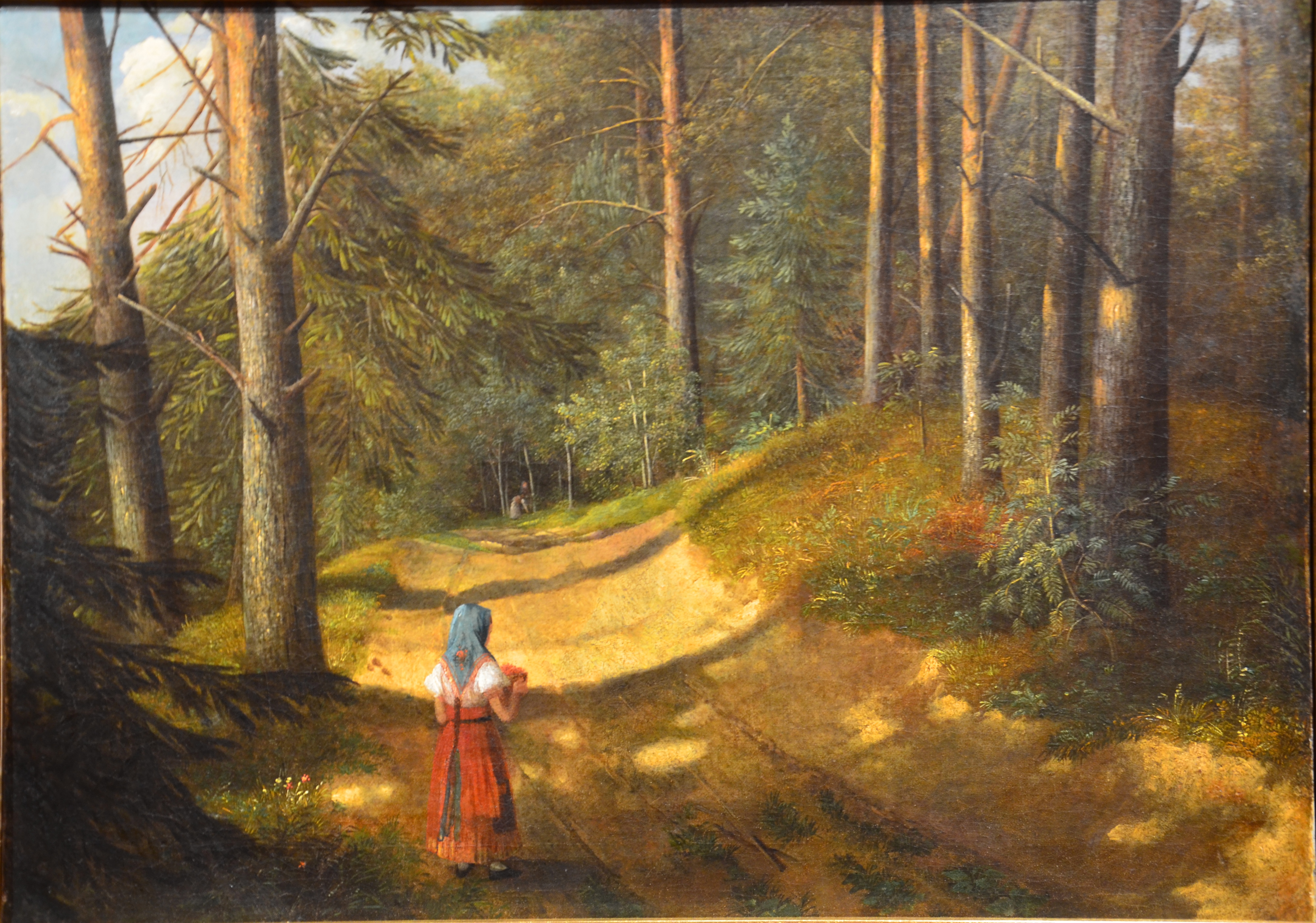
Jan Chrucki Forest

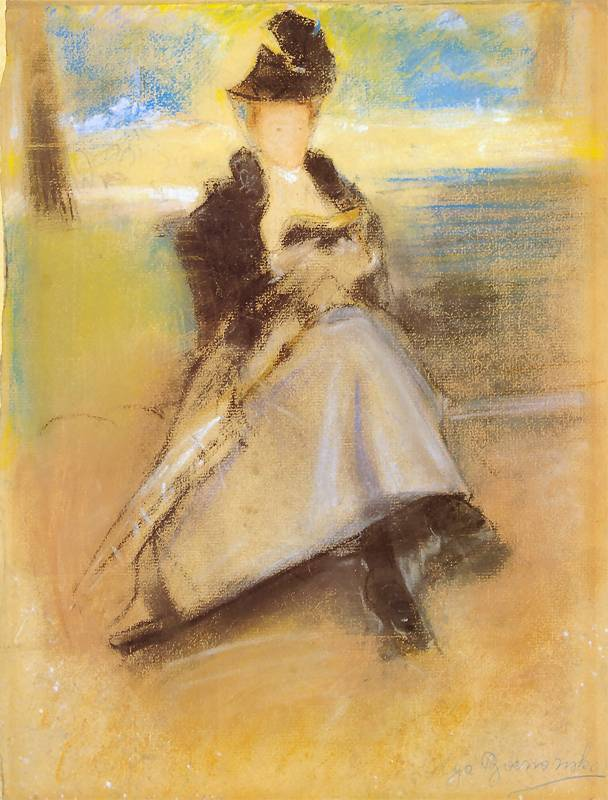
Olga Boznańska Portrait of a Parisian woman

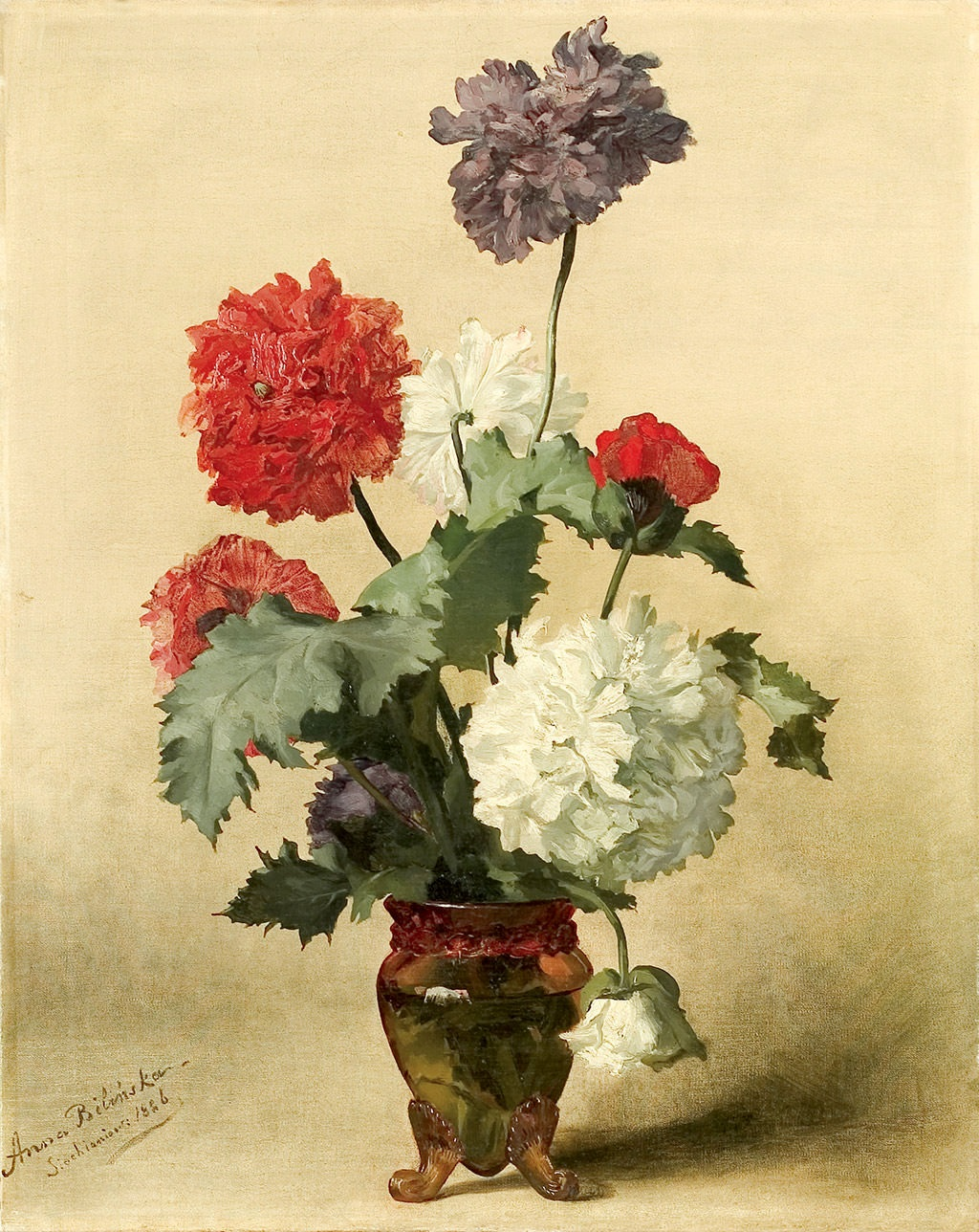
Anna Bilinska-Bogdanowicz Peony
