= Józefin, Bielsk County =

Józefin
- Village
- Location within Poland
- Coordinates: 52°44′34″N 22°43′59″E
- Country: Poland
- Voivodeship: Podlaskie
- County: Bielsk
- Gmina: Rudka
- Population: 60

Józefin [juˈzɛfin] is a village in the administrative district of Gmina Rudka, within Bielsk County, Podlaskie Voivodeship, in north-eastern Poland.
