= Podlaskie Voivodeship =

Voivodeship of Poland

Podlaskie Voivodeship Województwo podlaskie
- Voivodeship
- Flag Coat of arms Brandmark

- Location within Poland

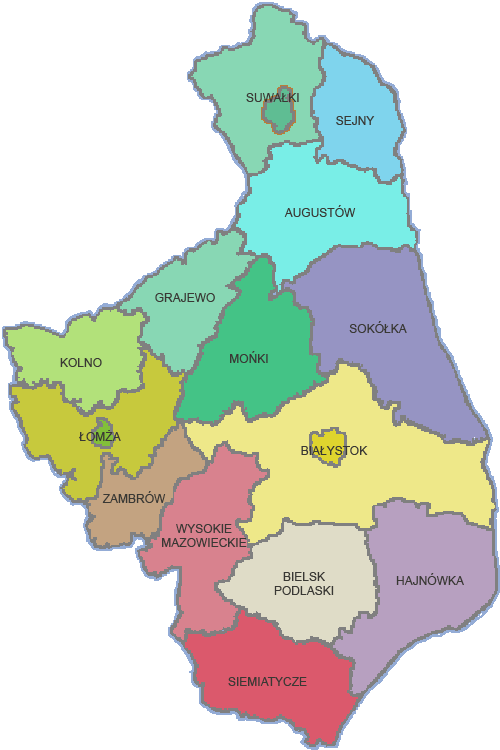
- Division into counties
- Coordinates (Białystok): 53°7′N 23°10′E
- Country: Poland
- Established: 1999
- Capital: Białystok
- Counties: 3 cities, 14 land counties*: Białystok; Łomża; Suwałki; Augustów County; Białystok County; Bielsk County; Grajewo County; Hajnówka County; Kolno County; Łomża County; Mońki County; Sejny County; Siemiatycze County; Sokółka County; Suwałki County; Wysokie Mazowieckie County; Zambrów County

Government
  - Body: Podlaskie Voivodeship executive board
  - Voivode: Jacek Brzozowski (PO)
  - Marshal: Łukasz Prokorym (PO)
  - EP: Podlaskie and Warmian-Masurian

Area
  - Total: 20,180 km^{2} (7,790 sq mi)

Population (2019)
  - Total: 1,179,430
  - Density: 58.45/km^{2} (151.4/sq mi)
  - Urban: 717,418
  - Rural: 462,012

GDP
  - Total: €19.131 billion (2024)
  - Per capita: €17,829 (2024)
- Time zone: UTC+1 (CET)
  - Summer (DST): UTC+2 (CEST)
- ISO 3166 code: PL-20
- Vehicle registration: B
- HDI (2019): 0.873 very high · 8th
- Website: bialystok.uw.gov.pl
- further divided into 118 gminas.

Podlaskie Voivodeship (Polish: województwo podlaskie [vɔjɛˈvut͡stfɔ pɔˈdlaskʲɛ]) is a voivodeship, or province, in northeastern Poland. The name of the voivodeship refers to the historical region of Podlasie, and some part of its territory corresponds to that region. The capital and largest city is Białystok.

It borders the Masovian Voivodeship to the west, Warmian-Masurian Voivodeship to the northwest, Lublin Voivodeship to the south, Belarus to the east, and Lithuania to the northeast.

The voivodeship was created on 1 January 1999, pursuant to the Polish local government reforms adopted in 1998, from the former Białystok and Łomża Voivodeships and the eastern half of the former Suwałki Voivodeship.

== Etymology ==
The voivodeship takes its name from the historic region of Poland called Podlasie, or in Latin known as Podlachia.

There are two opinions regarding the origin of the region's name. People often derive it from the Proto-Slavic les or las, meaning "forest", i.e., it is an area "by the wood(s)" or an "area of forests", which would bring Podlasie close in meaning to adjacent Polesia. This theory has been questioned, as it does not properly take into consideration the vowel shifts "a" > "e" > "i" in various Slavic languages (in fact, it mixes vowels from different languages). However, this etymology was supported by the Polish linguist Bogumił Samuel Linde, who in his Dictionary of the Polish Language proposed that Podlasie was named for its proximity to dense forests, referring to it as "a land near the forests". He argued that the name could be linked to its geographical position and historical landscape. Heavily wooded Podlaskie is home to the primeval Białowieża Forest and National Park, the habitat of the European wisent bison and tarpan.

A second view holds that the term comes from the expression pod Lachem, i.e., "under the Poles" (see: Lechia). Some claim it to mean "under Polish rule", as the region was under Polish rule at various periods in the Middle Ages, although the area belonged to the Grand Duchy of Lithuania from 1466 until the 1569 Privilege of restoration of Podlasie land to the Polish Crown, however, the south-eastern part remained within Lithuania until 1795.

A better variant of the latter theory holds that the name originates from the period when the territory was within the Trakai Voivodeship of the Grand Duchy of Lithuania, along the border with Mazovia, primarily a fief of the Poland of the Piasts, and later part of the Kingdom of Poland. Hence pod Lachem would mean "near the Poles", "along the border with Poland". The Lithuanian name of the region, Palenkė, has exactly this meaning.

== History ==
The voivodeship was created on January 1, 1999, out of the former Białystok and Łomża Voivodeships and the eastern half of the former Suwałki Voivodeship, pursuant to the Polish local government reforms adopted in 1998.

As a result of the introduction of the new administrative division of the country on 1 January 1999, Łomża lost its status as the capital of the voivodeship, which in connection with this weakened the rank of this city as an administrative centre of regional importance. Since the beginning of the existence of the voivodeship, the most loud dispute between Łomża and Białystok has been the Via Baltica, which as an expressway, according to the original plans, was to run from Warsaw to the borders of Lithuania through Łomża-Grajewo-Suwałki. After Łomża lost its status as a voivodeship capital and the strengthening of Białystok's position, the project was changed, the course of the route was moved by several dozen kilometres. The construction of the Via Baltica was complicated by the conflict over the Rospuda Valley, a protected natural area, which was to be cut by the Augustów bypass. One of the biggest problems of the newly established voivodeship was unemployment. In 1999, companies began to generate losses for their owners, which resulted in employee layoffs. The deterioration of the companies' condition was related to the crisis in Russia, the low competitiveness of companies on Polish and foreign markets. The poverty zone was growing. In January 2000, approximately 75 thousand people were unemployed in the Podlaskie Voivodeship. The unemployment rate was over 12%. The highest unemployment rate in the Podlaskie Voivodeship was in Grajewo County.

In the Podlaskie Voivodeship Development Strategy adopted in 2000, Białystok was included in the central functional area. On March 21, 2005, the Podlaskie Voivodeship Sejmik adopted the first Regional Innovation Strategy for the Podlaskie Voivodeship. The restructuring of the economic base and creation of conditions for international cooperation were assumed. On 30 January 2007, the Council of Ministers accepted the draft Operational Programme for the Development of Eastern Poland for the years 2007-2013 together with the Indicative Investment Plan for the programme, which is a list of large and key projects selected from among the applications submitted to the Ministry of Regional Development from 5 voivodeships. Podlaskie Voivodeship received 386.86 million euros. Four priorities were implemented: modern economy, voivodeship growth centres, road infrastructure and technical assistance.

On November 15, 2024, a commemorative ceremony to the 25th anniversary of the creation of the voivodeship took place at the Magna Hall of Branicki Palace in Białystok, in which the Badge of Honour of Podlaskie Voivodeship was awarded.

== Geography ==
It has a varied landscape, shaped in the north by Baltic glaciation, the rest by Middle Poland glaciation. The highest peaks are in the north (Rowelska Top - 298 m), where the landscape is dominated by a hilly lake district. Lakeland: Zachodniosuwalskie, Wschodniosuwalskie, Ełckie) and Sandrowy lake district (Augustów Plain) in the central and southern pre-glacial plains prevail (plateaus: Kolneńska, Białystok, Wysokomazowiecka, Drohiczynska, Sokólskie Hills, Międzyrzecko łomżyński, Plain Bielsko), varied in topography with small basins and river valleys. Kurpie lies on the west edge of the outwash plains. Sand, gravel, clay, moraine, and in the valleys and basins of the rivers silt, sand and river peat predominate on the surface.

== Environment ==
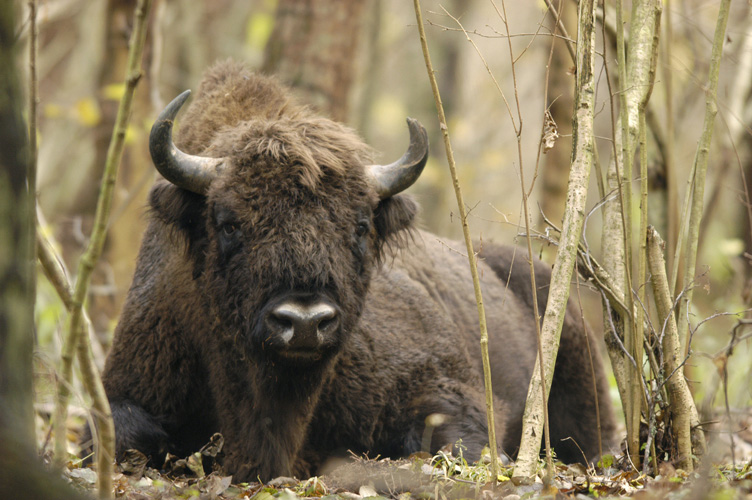
The Białowieża Forest is a UNESCO World Heritage Site

The vast forests (Białowieża, Augustów, Knyszyń, Kurpiowska), some of which are the only ones in Europe to have retained their original character, contain a unique wealth of flora and fauna. The vegetation of the region is extremely diverse, which contributes to the richness of the animal world. Visitors can also see moose, wolves, lynx and bison living in the Białowieża Forest and Knyszyń Forest.

Podlaskie has the lowest population density of the sixteen Polish voivodeships, and its largely unspoiled nature is one of its chief assets. Around 30% of the area of the voivodeship is under legal protection. The Polish part of the Białowieża Forest biosphere reserve (also a World Heritage Site) is in Podlaskie. There are four National Parks (Białowieża, Biebrza, Narew and Wigry), three Landscape Parks (Knyszyń Forest, Łomża and Suwałki), 88 nature reserves, and 15 protected landscape areas. The voivodeship constitutes a part of the ecologically clean area known as "the Green Lungs of Poland".

== Climate ==
Podlaskie has a Warm Summer Continental or Hemiboreal climate (Dfb) according to the Köppen climate classification system, which is characterized by warm temperatures during summer and long and frosty winters. It is substantially different from most of the other Polish lowlands. The region is one of the coldest in Poland, with the average temperature in January being −5 °C (23 °F). The average temperature in a year is 7 °C (45 °F). The number of frost days ranges from 50 to 60, with frost from 110 to 138 days and the duration of snow cover from 90 to 110 days. Mean annual rainfall values oscillate around 550 millimetres (21.7 in), and the vegetation period lasts 200 to 210 days.

Podlaskie is the coldest region of Poland, located in the very northeast of the country near the border with Belarus and Lithuania. The region has a continental climate which is characterized by high temperatures during summer and long and frosty winters. The climate is affected by the cold fronts which come from Scandinavia and Siberia. The average temperature in the winter ranges from −15 °C (5 °F) to −4 °C (25 °F).

One of the cities located in Podlaskie, Suwałki, is called as The Polish North Pole, due to it is coldest temperature average around Poland.

Climate data for Białystok
Month	Jan	Feb	Mar	Apr	May	Jun	Jul	Aug	Sep	Oct	Nov	Dec	Year
Record high °C (°F)	12 (54)	16 (61)	20 (68)	24 (75)	30 (86)	30 (86)	33 (91)	32 (90)	28 (82)	22 (72)	12 (54)	11 (52)	33 (91)
Mean daily maximum °C (°F)	−1 (30)	0 (32)	4 (39)	11 (52)	17 (63)	20 (68)	21 (70)	21 (70)	16 (61)	10 (50)	3 (37)	1 (34)	10 (51)
Mean daily minimum °C (°F)	−6 (21)	−6 (21)	−2 (28)	1 (34)	7 (45)	10 (50)	12 (54)	11 (52)	7 (45)	3 (37)	0 (32)	−3 (27)	2 (36)
Record low °C (°F)	−34 (−29)	−25 (−13)	−23 (−9)	−7 (19)	−3 (27)	1 (34)	5 (41)	2 (36)	−4 (25)	−10 (14)	−16 (3)	−26 (−15)	−34 (−29)
Average precipitation mm (inches)	30 (1.2)	20 (0.8)	30 (1.2)	30 (1.2)	50 (2.0)	70 (2.8)	70 (2.8)	70 (2.8)	50 (2.0)	40 (1.6)	40 (1.6)	40 (1.6)	580 (22.8)
Average precipitation days	8	7	8	8	8	10	10	9	9	8	10	10	106
Average rainy days	7	7	8	9	7	8	8	7	8	9	9	6	93
Average snowy days	9	10	7	3	0	0	0	0	0	0	5	7	41
Mean monthly sunshine hours	21	54	139	138	207	236	217	205	162	97	27	20	1,523
Source 1: Weatherbase
Source 2: ClimateData.eu

== Subdivisions and Białystok Metropolitan Region ==
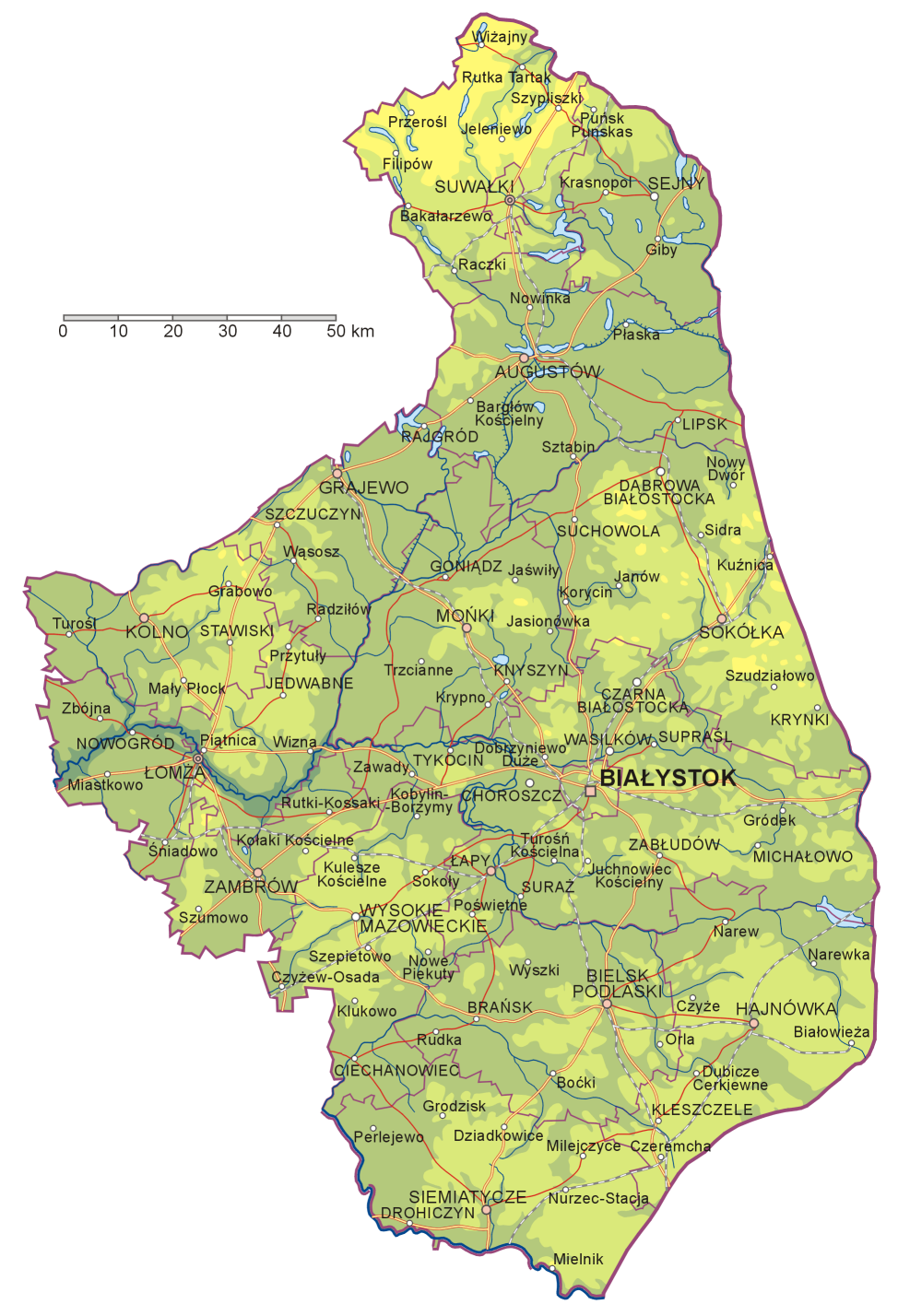
Map of the Podlaskie Voivodeship

Podlaskie Voivodeship is divided into 17 counties (powiats): 3 city counties, those being Białystok, Suwałki, and Łomża. It is also divided into 14 land counties, which these 14 counties are further divided into 118 gminas.

Metropolitan Białystok was designated by the Voivodeship in the Regulation No. 52/05 of 16 May 2005 in order to help economically develop the region. In 2006, the metropolitan area's population was 450,254 inhabitants. It covers an area of 1,521 km^{2}. For one km^{2}, there are about 265 people. Among urban residents there are more women - 192 thousand. For every 100 men, there are 108 women on average. The municipalities adjacent to Białystok are slowly losing their agricultural character, becoming residential suburban neighborhoods.

== Demographics ==
Religion in Podlaskie Voivodeship (2021)
1. Catholicism (74.0%)
2. Eastern Orthodoxy (8.00%)
3. Protestantism (0.20%)
4. Islam (0.06%)
5. Other (0.20%)
6. Irreligion (3.00%)
7. Undeclared (14.0%)

Historical population
Year	Pop.	±%
1988	1,188,547	—
2002	1,208,606	+1.7%
2011	1,202,365	−0.5%
2021	1,154,283	−4.0%

Podlaskie is the most culturally diverse region of Poland. It has the country's largest Eastern Orthodoxy population (but Caholicism is still the dominant) mainly from the large Belarusian minority. It also has the highest amount of Lithuanians and Tatars of the voivodeships, and Poland's oldest mosque is located in the village of Kruszyniany. The historic Jews have also influenced the local culture.

Today, mainly Polish is spoken in Podlaskie. The Belarusian language is spoken by the Belarusian minority in the Bielsk, Hajnówka and Siemiatycze counties, while Lithuanian is preserved by the small but compact Lithuanian minority concentrated in the Sejny county. Podlachian language is spoken by a small local minority.

Population according to 2002 census:

- Poles - 1,135,347
- Belarusians - 46,420
- Lithuanians - 5,156
- Ukrainians - 1,441
- Russians - 647
- Romanis - 369
- Tatars - 323

At the end of 2009 in Podlaskie Voivodeship there were 1,189,700 inhabitants, 3.1 percent of the total population of Poland. The average density of the population, the number of the population per 1 km2, was 59. The urban population in the same period was 60.2 percent of the total number of inhabitants of the voivodeship, where the percentage of females in the total population amounted to 51.3 percent. A statistical inhabitant of Podlaskie was 37.7 years old, whereas in 2008 – 37.5 years old. The latest population projection predicts a consistent decrease in the population in Podlaskie Voivodeship. In the next 26 years, it will decrease by 117 thousand persons due to the ageing population.

== Government ==
The voivodeship's seat is the city of Białystok. Like all voivodeships, it has a government-appointed governor called the Voivode (Polish: wojewoda), as well as an elected Regional Assembly (sejmik) and of the executive elected by that assembly, headed by the voivodeship marshal (marszałek województwa). Administrative powers and competences are statutorily divided between these authorities.

=== Cities and towns ===
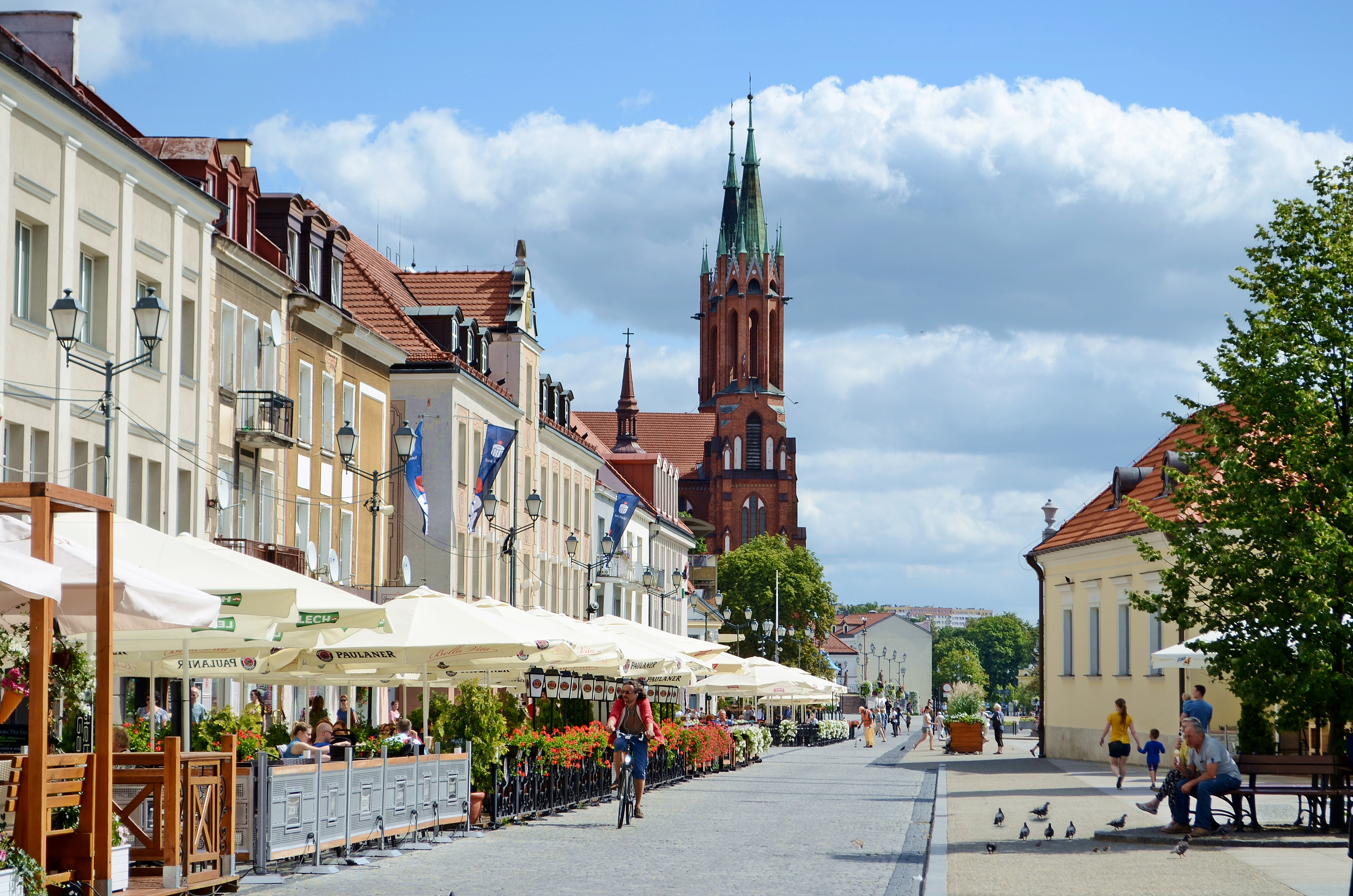
Białystok, capital and largest city of the voivodeship

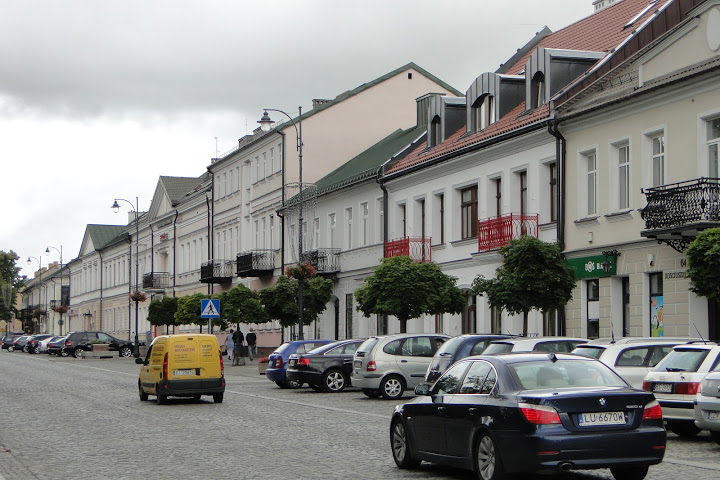
Suwałki, largest city in the northern part of the voivodeship and capital of the historical Suwałki Region

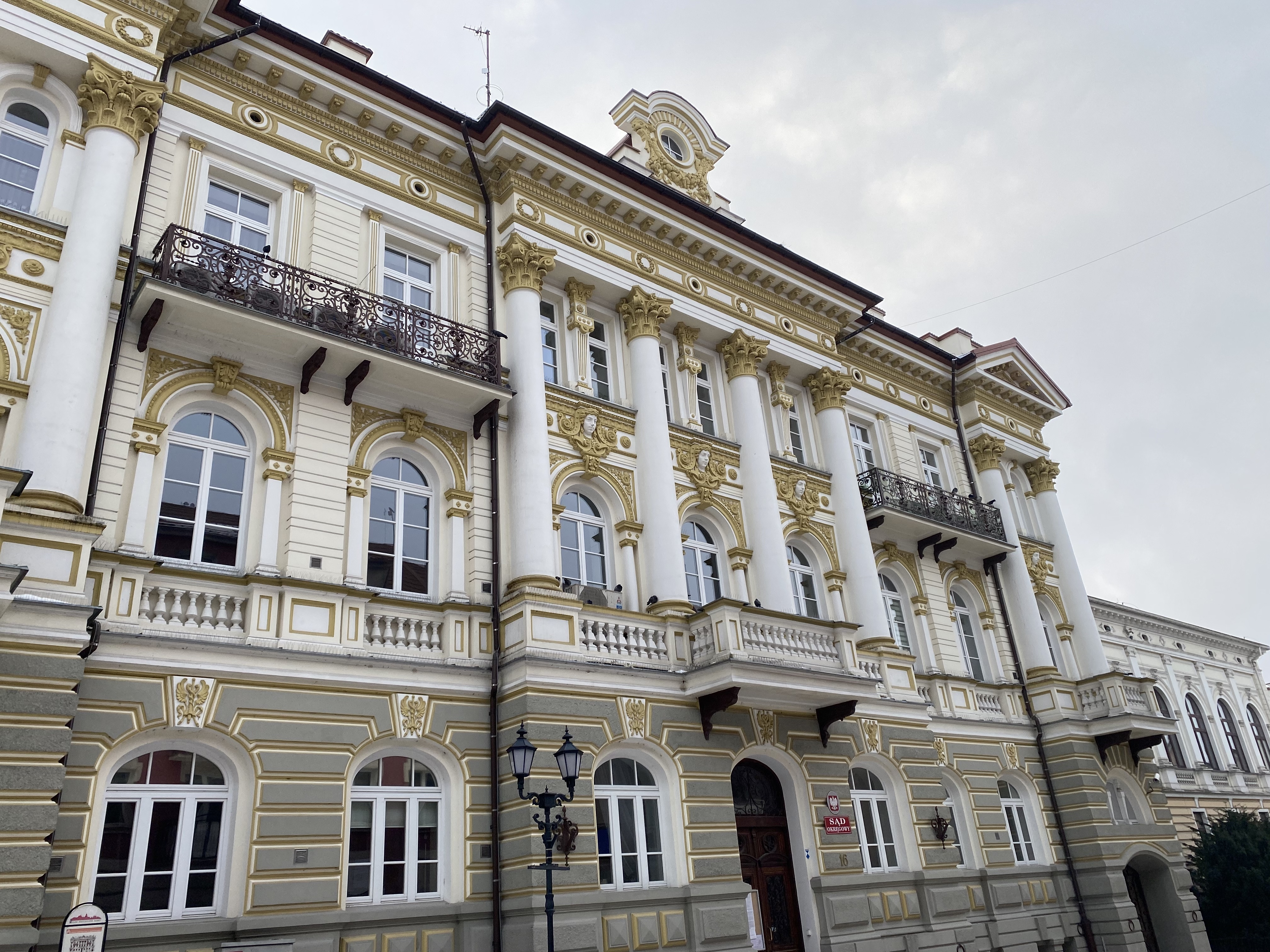
Łomża, largest city in the western part of the voivodeship

The voivodeship contains 3 cities and 37 towns. These are listed below in descending order of population (according to official figures for 2019)

Cities (governed by a city mayor or prezydent miasta):
1. Białystok (297,356)
2. Suwałki (69,858)
3. Łomża (62,965)

Towns:

1. Augustów (30,190)
2. Bielsk Podlaski (25,290)
3. Zambrów (22,098)
4. Grajewo (21,909)
5. Hajnówka (20,580)
6. Sokółka (18,134)
7. Łapy (15,609)
8. Siemiatycze (14,418)
9. Wasilków (11,527)
10. Kolno (10,214)
11. Mońki (9,986)
12. Wysokie Mazowieckie (9,415)
13. Czarna Białostocka (9,318)
14. Choroszcz (5,890)
15. Dąbrowa Białostocka (5,520)
16. Sejny (5,286)
17. Ciechanowiec (4,631)
18. Supraśl (4,605)
19. Brańsk (3,767)
20. Szczuczyn (3,376)
21. Michałowo (3,026)
22. Knyszyn (2,748)
23. Czyżew (2,633)
24. Zabłudów (2,400)
25. Krynki (2,405)
26. Lipsk (2,326)
27. Suchowola (2,183)
28. Stawiski (2,174)
29. Szepietowo (2,170)
30. Nowogród (2,155)
31. Tykocin (1,973)
32. Drohiczyn (1,970)
33. Goniądz (1,814)
34. Jedwabne (1,626)
35. Rajgród (1,573)
36. Kleszczele (1,250)
37. Suraż (988)

== Economy ==
The Gross domestic product (GDP) of the voivodeship was around 11 billion euros in 2018, accounting for 2.2% of Polish economic output. GDP per capita adjusted for purchasing power was €15,200 or 50% of the EU average in the same year. The GDP per employee was 57% of the EU average. Podlaskie Voivodeship is the 12th voivodeship in terms of GDP per capita in Poland.

The following are general economic indicators for Podlaskie Voivodeship:

1. Population (as of 30 September 2009) - 1,190,735
2. Average paid employment in enterprise sector (November 2009) - 95896
3. Average monthly gross wages and salaries in enterprise sector (November 2009) - 2,813.05 zł
4. Unemployment rate (as of the end of November 2009) - 12,0%
5. Dwellings completed in November 2009 - 661
6. Procurement of milk (November 2009) - 126.8 mln l
7. National economy entities from the REGON register, excluding persons tending private farms (as of the end of November 2009) - 89,654

According to the REGON register in the year 2002 there were around 95 thousand companies registered in the Podlaskie region (97% of them in the private sector), dealing with;

- Trade and servicing – 33.2%
- Providing services to real estates and companies – 11.8%
- Construction – 10.5%
- Industrial processing – 9.7%
- Transport 8.3%
- Agriculture, hunting and forestry 4.5%

=== Agriculture ===
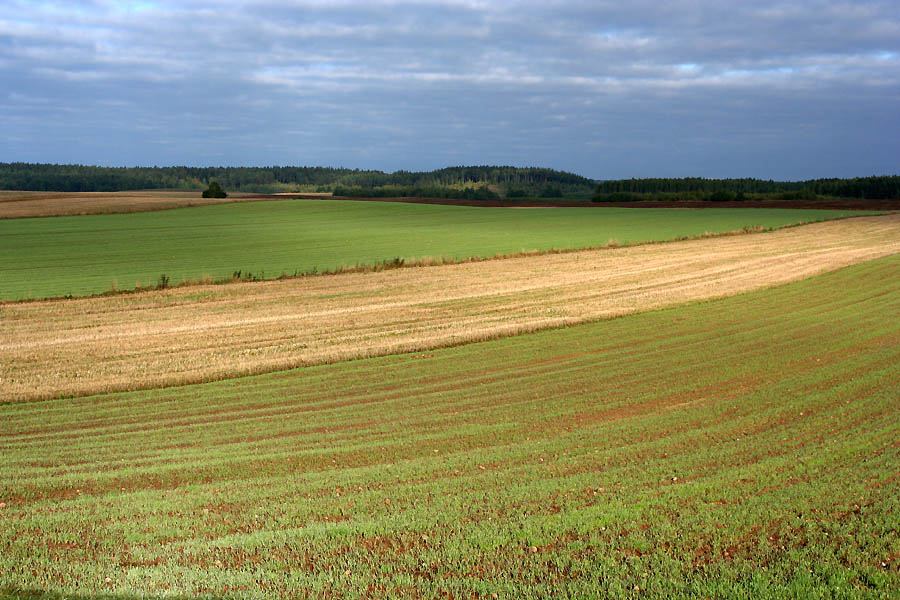
A typical Podlaskie landscape near the village of Bohoniki

Arable land constitutes around 60% of the total area of the region – most of which is ploughland (around 40%), forests, meadows and pastures. Over 120 000 farms are registered, roughly half of which are small farms of 1–5 ha and medium-sized farms of 5–10 ha. The smaller farms prefer intensive production (gardening, orcharding), whereas the larger ones engage in cattle and crop production. The cattle-raising farms are mainly oriented towards milk production.

In June 2015, the total area of land in agricultural holdings in the Podlaskie Voivodeship amounted to 1,243.3 thousand hectares. ha. Agricultural land occupied 1058.3 thousand. ha, forests and forest land - 134.7 thous. ha, while the remaining land - 50.4 thous. ha. The average area of agricultural land in a farm was 10.35 ha. Agriculture in Podlaskie Voivodeship is characterized by a high share of agricultural land in good agricultural condition (99.3%) - these include arable land, permanent crops, home gardens, permanent meadows and permanent pastures. 98.9 percent from all land in agricultural holdings, i.e. 1,254.3 thous. ha, belongs to individual farms. Podlaskie Voivodeship has the highest percentage of grassland among all voivodships of the country (almost 20% of the area). This is used to develop dairy and beef cattle farming. Podlaskie has the largest cattle stock in Poland (the average herd size in 2016 is 37.9). In terms of milk producing, the voivodeship, together with the Masovian Voivodeship, ranks first in the country. Podlaskie Voivodeship receive about 20% of the total production in the country. Cereals is an important crops grown in the region and themainly: wheat, rye, barley, oat, triticale, cereal mixtures, grain maize, millet, buckwheat. Other crops grown by farmers include, among others, potatoes, oil seeds, forage plants (green fodder, carrots, beets, turnips or alfalfa).

The natural conditions of the region are conducive to the development of organic growing, which at present is practised by around 100 farms. Over 600 farms in the region offer agritourist services.

== Transportation ==
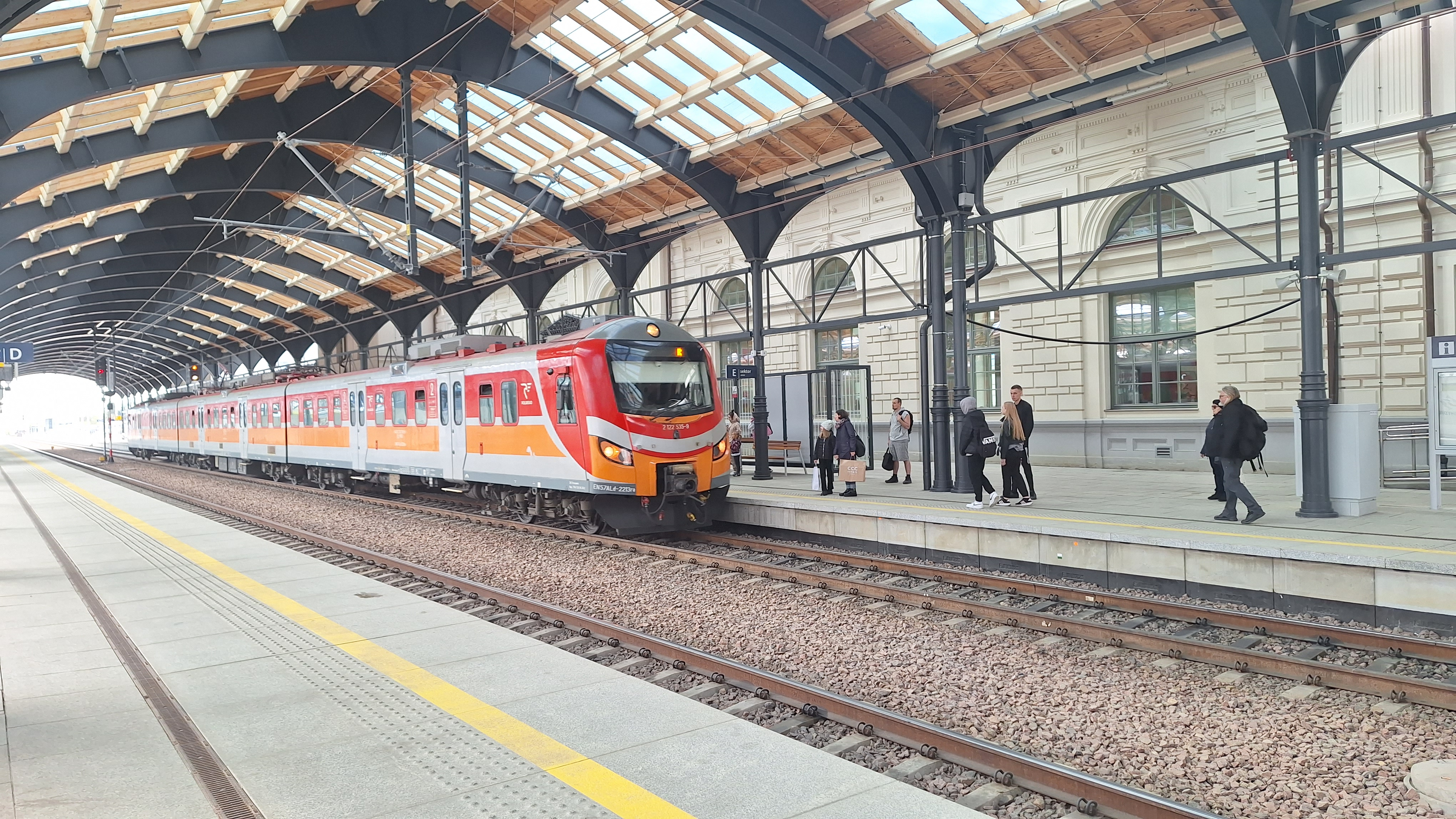
Białystok railway station

== Tourism and sights ==
The Białowieża Forest is a UNESCO World Heritage Site. There are five Historic Monuments of Poland in the voivodeship:

- Augustów Canal
- St. Roch's Church in Białystok
- Mosques and cemeteries in Bohoniki and Kruszyniany, the two oldest mosques in Poland
- Monastery of the Annunciation in Supraśl
- Old Town of Tykocin

There are several castles and palaces in the region, including the Branicki Palace and Lubomirski Palace in Białystok, Royal Castle in Tykocin, Branicki Summer Palace in Choroszcz, Ossoliński Palace in Rudka, and Buchholtz Palace in Supraśl.

There are two spa towns in the voivodeship: Augustów and Supraśl. Augustów and Rajgród are popular summer destinations owing to their lakes. Białystok is known for its public parks and gardens, including the Branicki Garden and Planty Park. Tykocin and Supraśl are primary examples of preserved historic small towns in the voivodeship. The Baroque town halls in Białystok and Bielsk Podlaski are home to local museums.

The voivodeship is rich in Baroque churches and monasteries, most notably in Różanystok, Wigry, Sejny, Tykocin, Drohiczyn, Bielsk Podlaski, Siemiatycze, Choroszcz, although there are also churches in other styles, including the Gothic St. Michael and John the Baptist Cathedral in Łomża and Saint John the Baptist church in Wizna, the Renaissance Old Parish Church in Białystok and the adjacent Białystok Cathedral, and Neoclassical Co-cathedral of St. Alexander in Suwałki. The Catholic Sanctuary of the Presentation of Virgin Mary in Różanystok, Sanctuary of Our Lady of Studzieniczna in Augustów and Christ's Transfiguration Orthodox church on the Grabarka Holy Mount are important pilgrimage destinations. The Mannerist-Baroque Tykocin Synagogue in Tykocin, one of the best preserved historic synagogues in Poland, and one of the few not destroyed by Nazi Germany, houses a museum.

The largest museum dedicated to the history of the region is the Podlaskie Museum in Białystok with branches in Białystok, Bielsk Podlaski, Choroszcz, Supraśl, Tykocin and Turośń Kościelna. Białystok is home to the Sybir Memorial Museum, the main Polish museum devoted to history of Russian deportations of Poles to Siberia. There is a museum dedicated to Polish poet Maria Konopnicka at her birthplace in Suwałki.

There are also the Osowiec and Łomża fortresses.

There are numerous World War II memorials scattered across the voivodeship, including memorials at the sites of German and Soviet massacres of Poles, and Holocaust memorials. The ruins of the bunker of Captain Władysław Raginis in Góra Strękowa are preserved as a memorial to the heroic Polish defense in the Battle of Wizna.

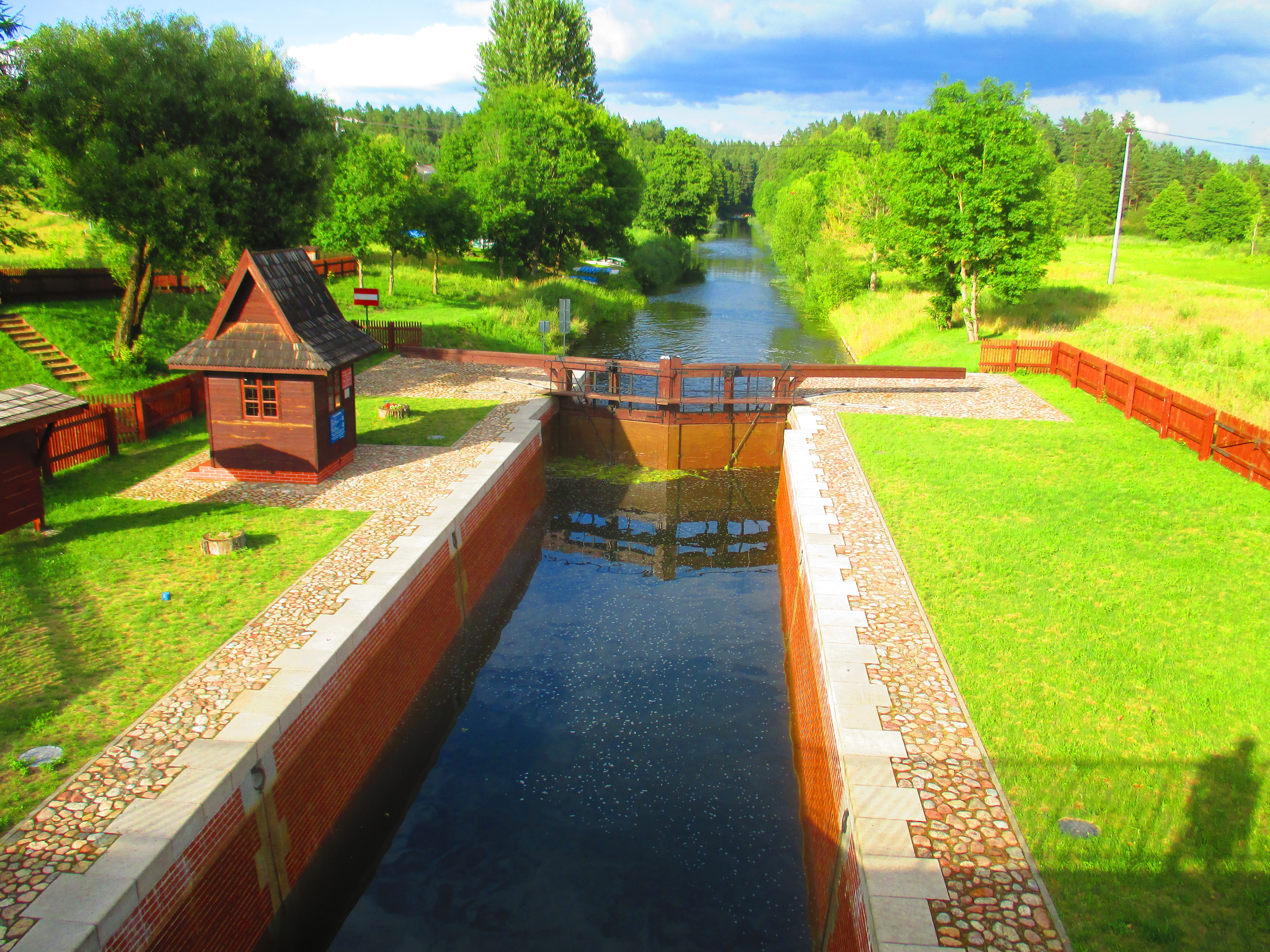
Augustów Canal

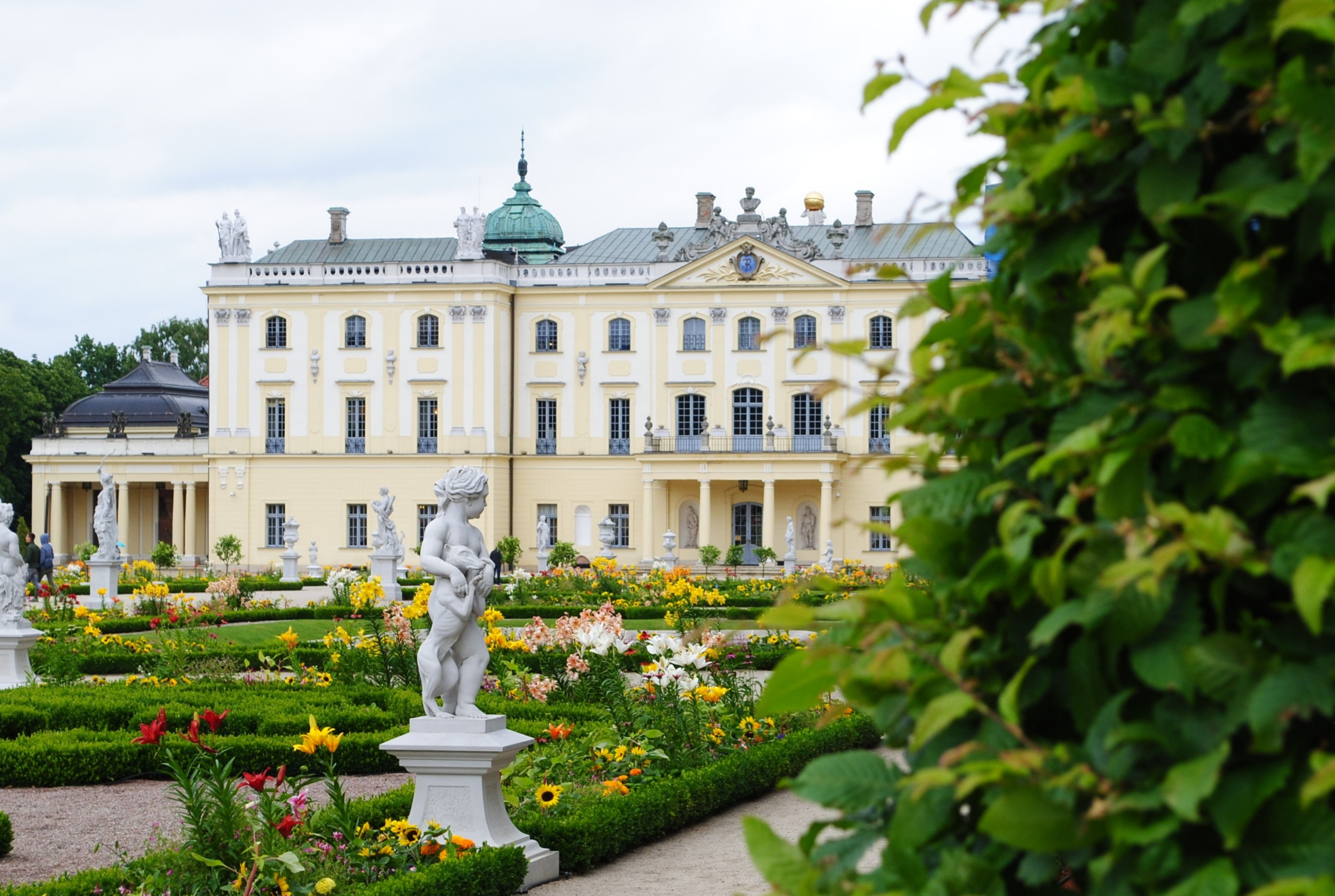
Branicki Palace in Białystok

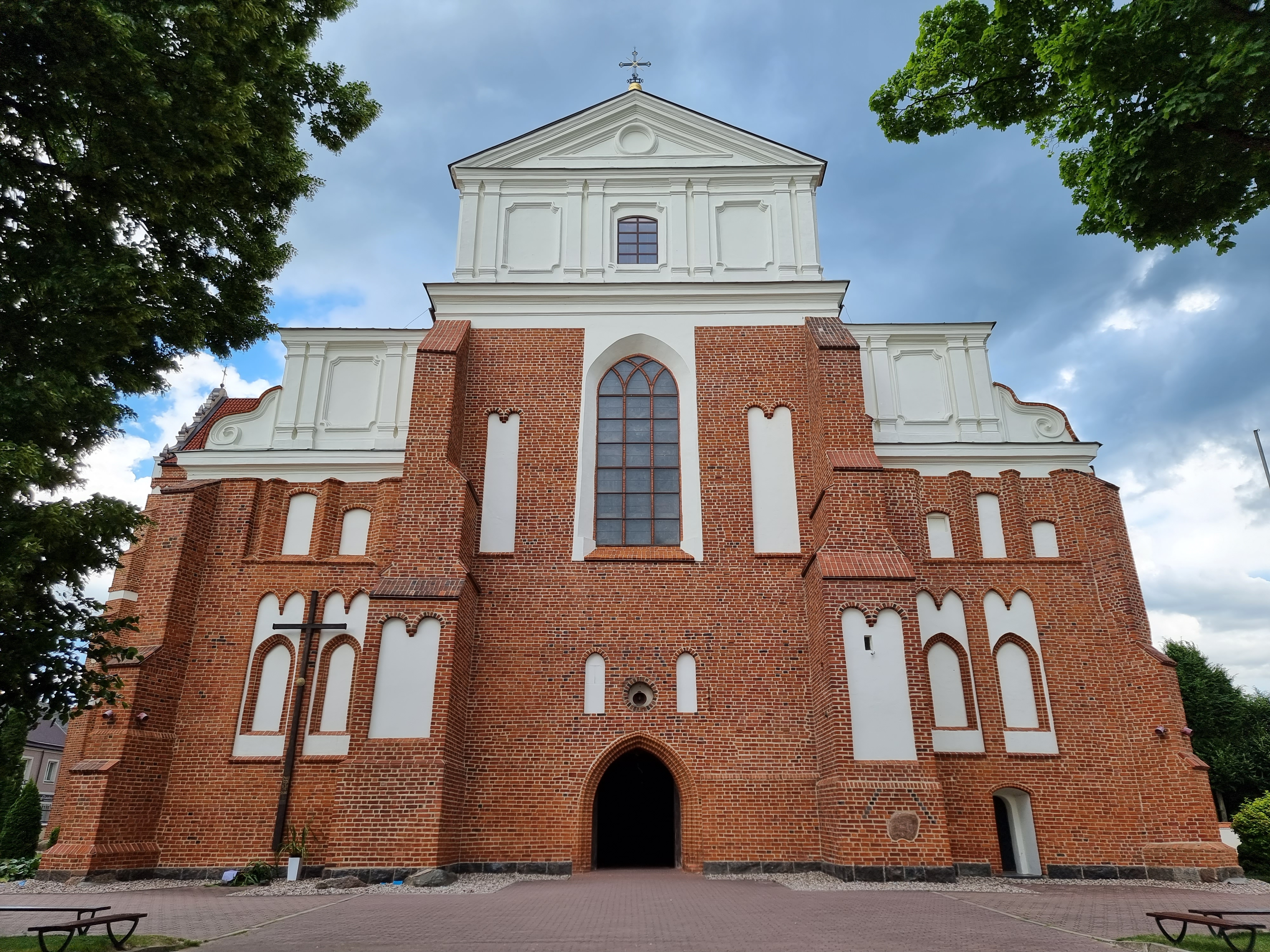
St. Michael Cathedral in Łomża

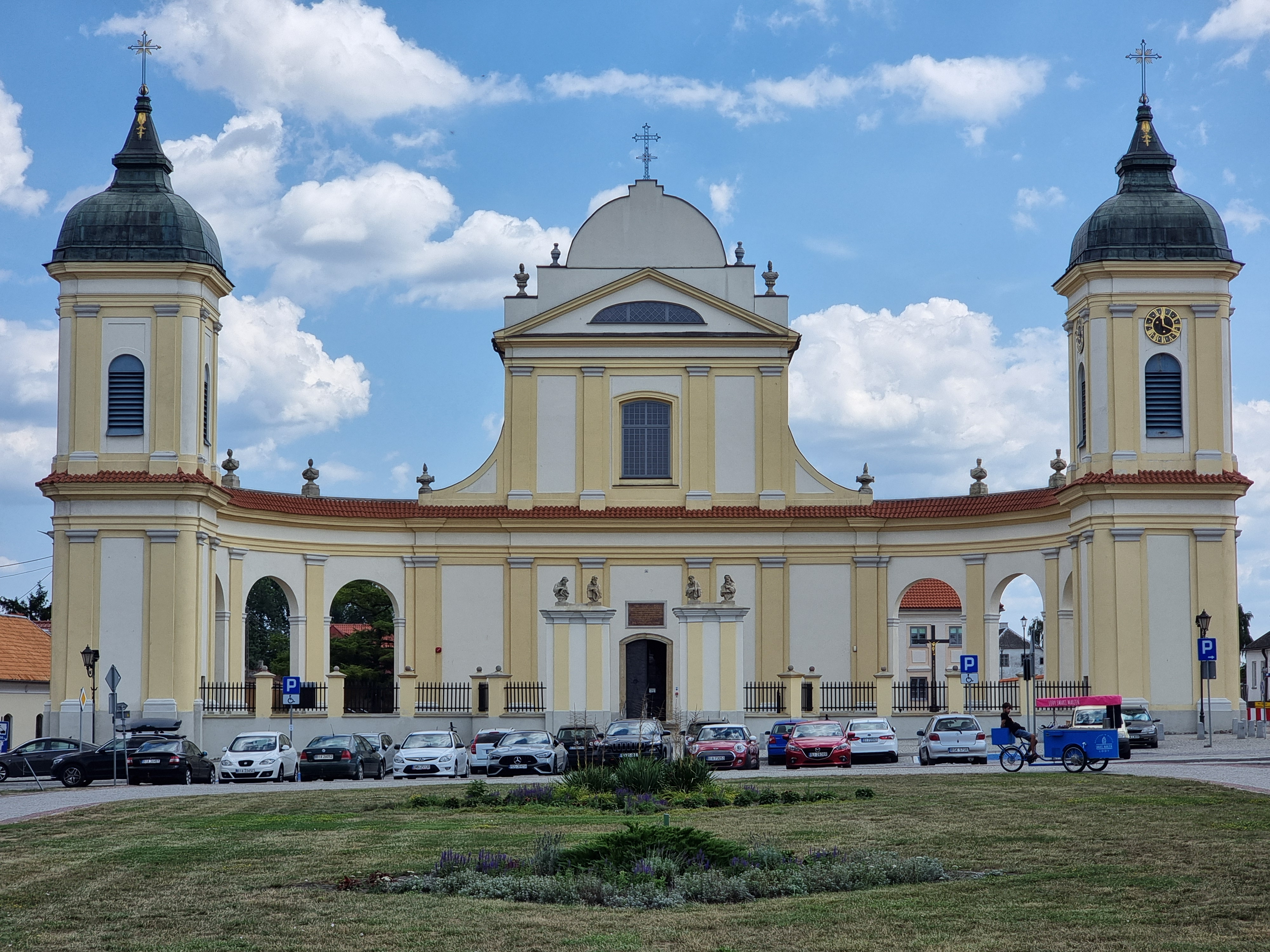
Holy Trinity church in Tykocin

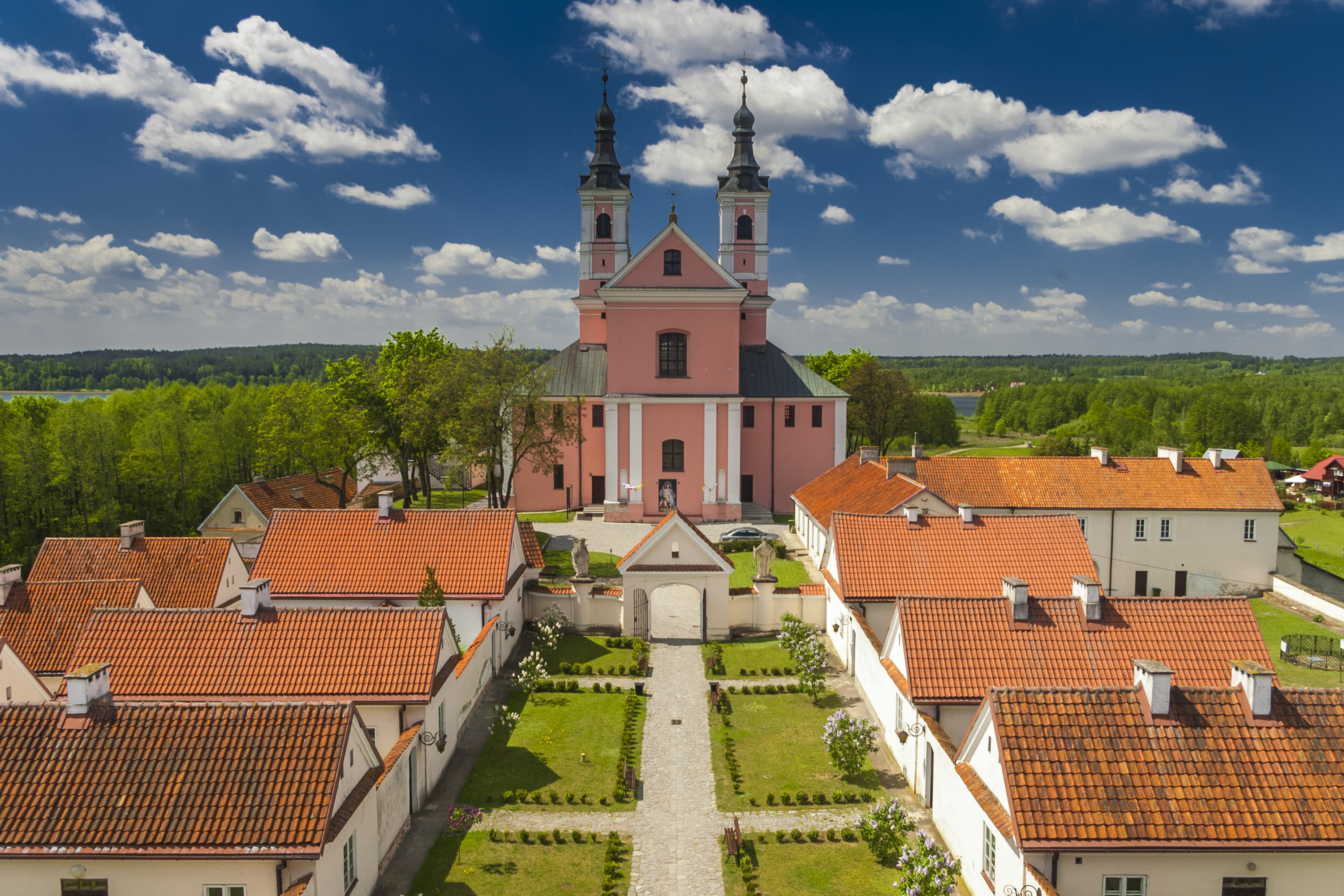
Monastery in Wigry

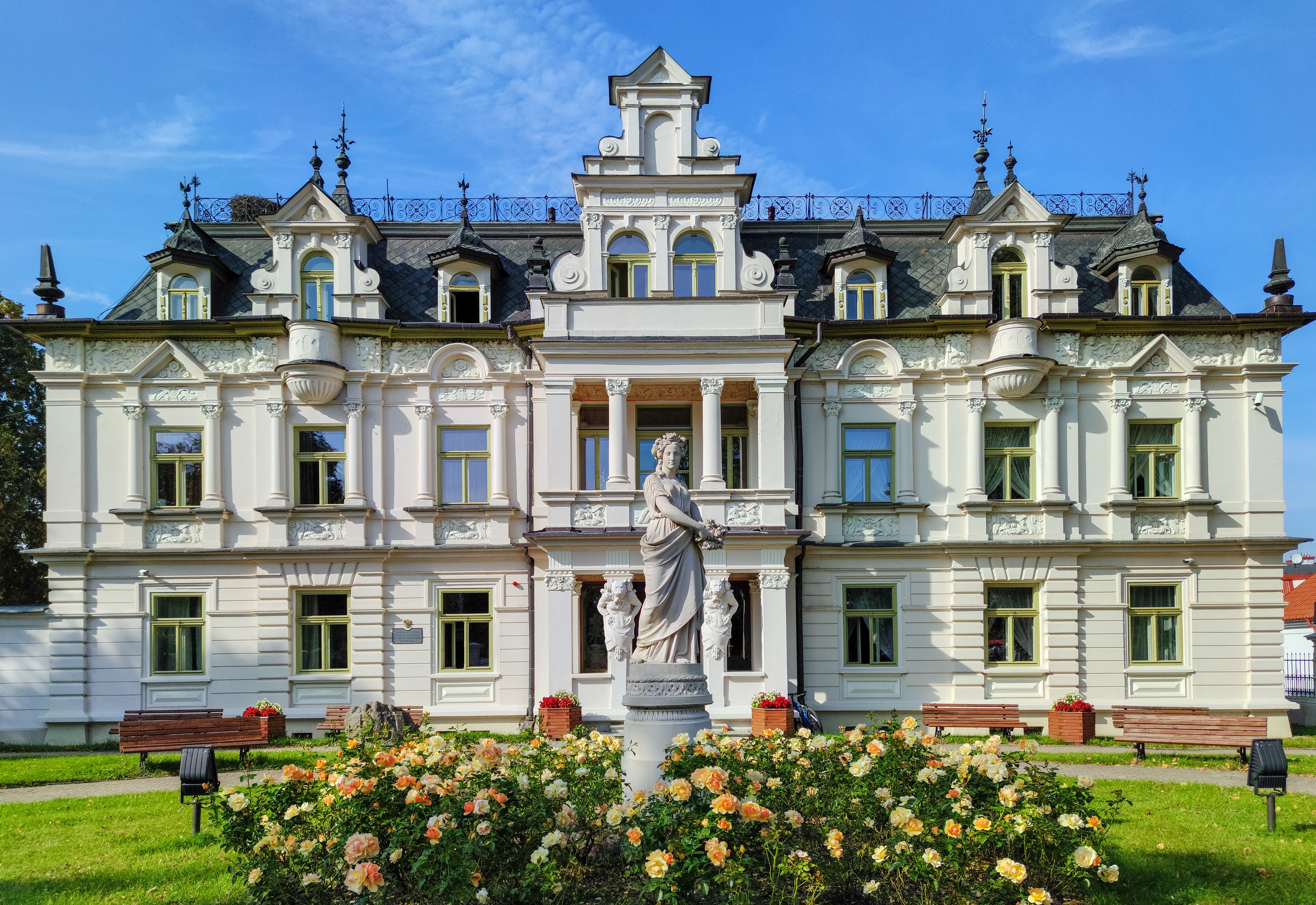
Buchholtz Palace in Supraśl

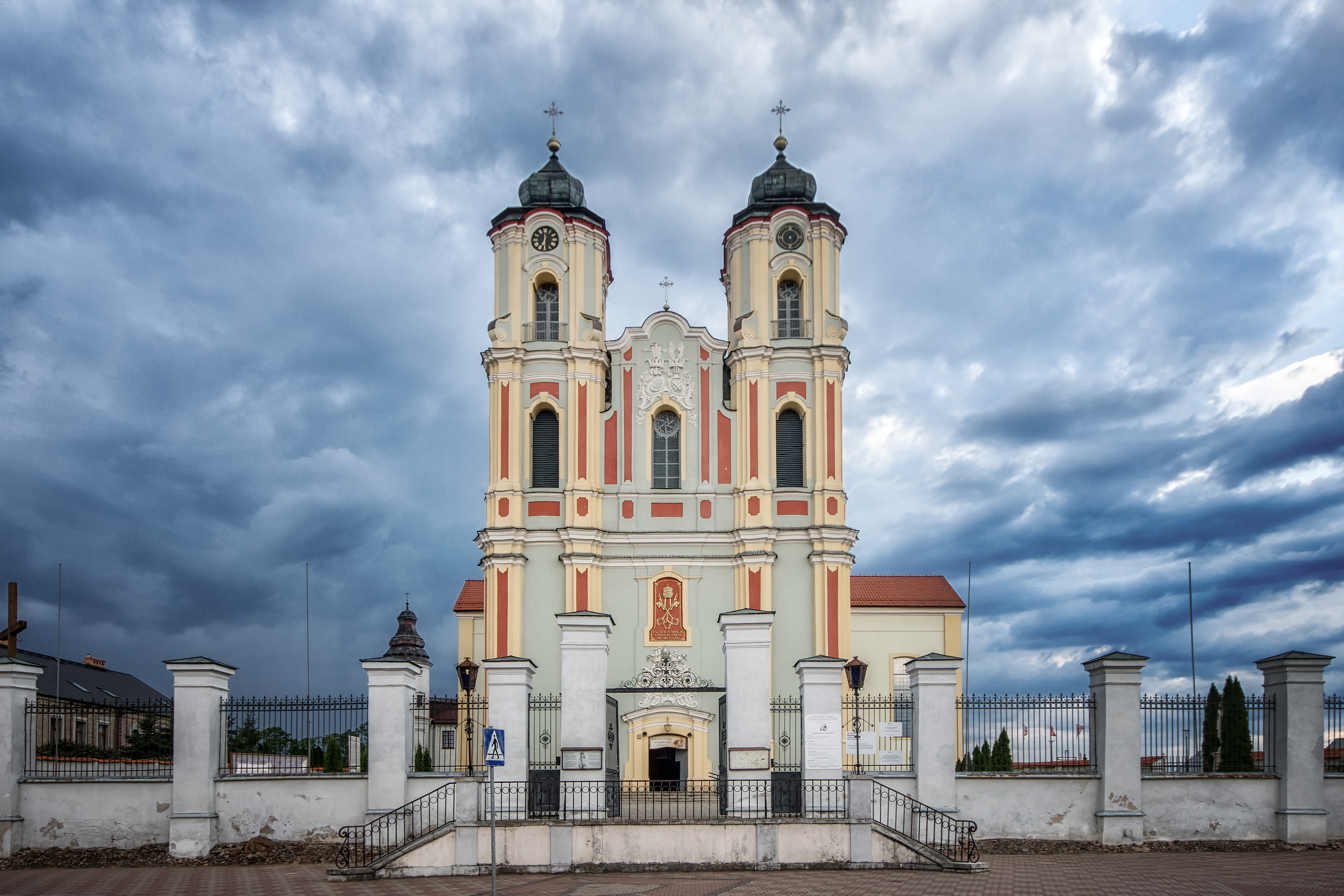
Basilica of the Visitation in Sejny

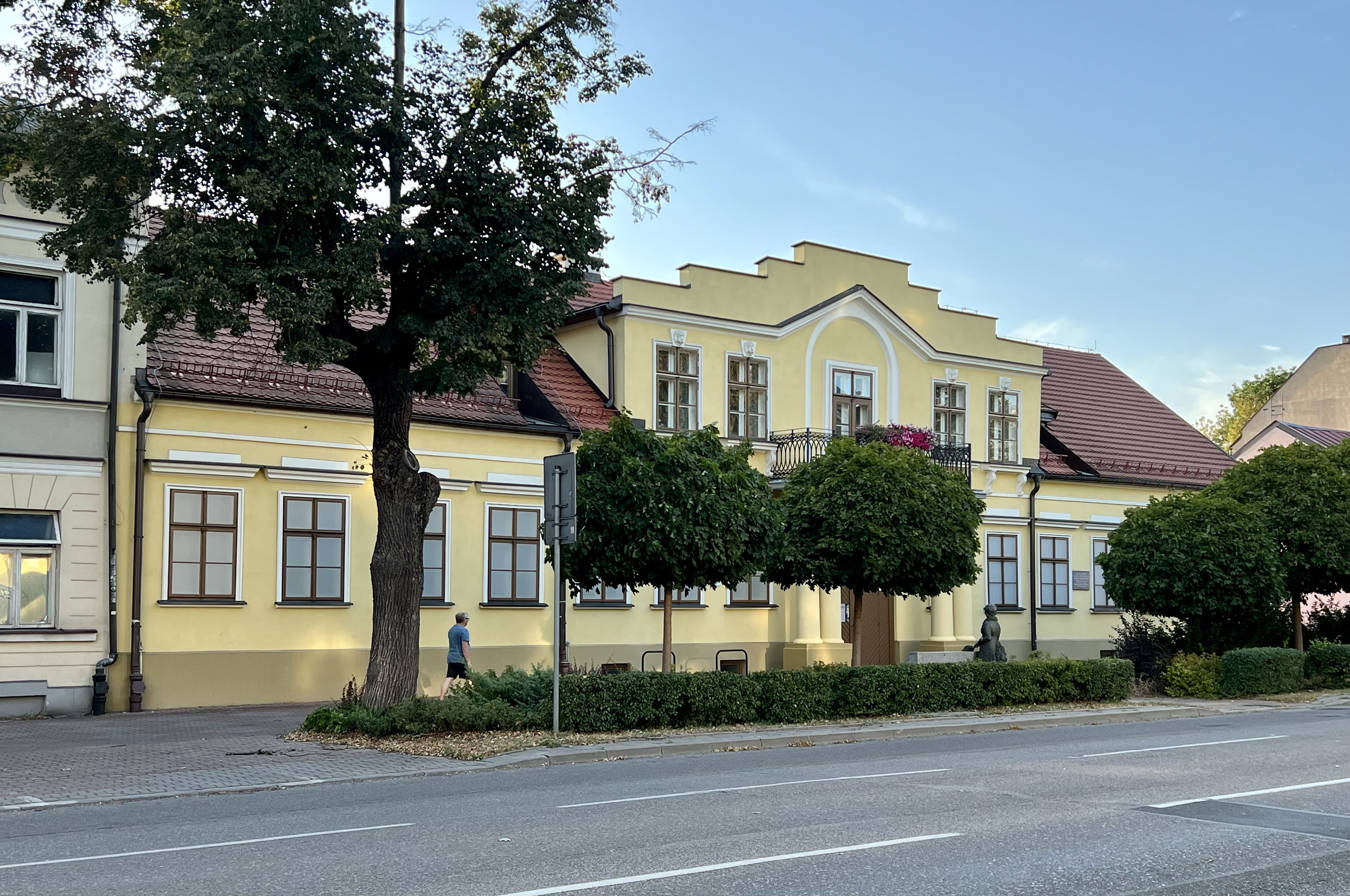
Birthplace and museum of Maria Konopnicka in Suwałki

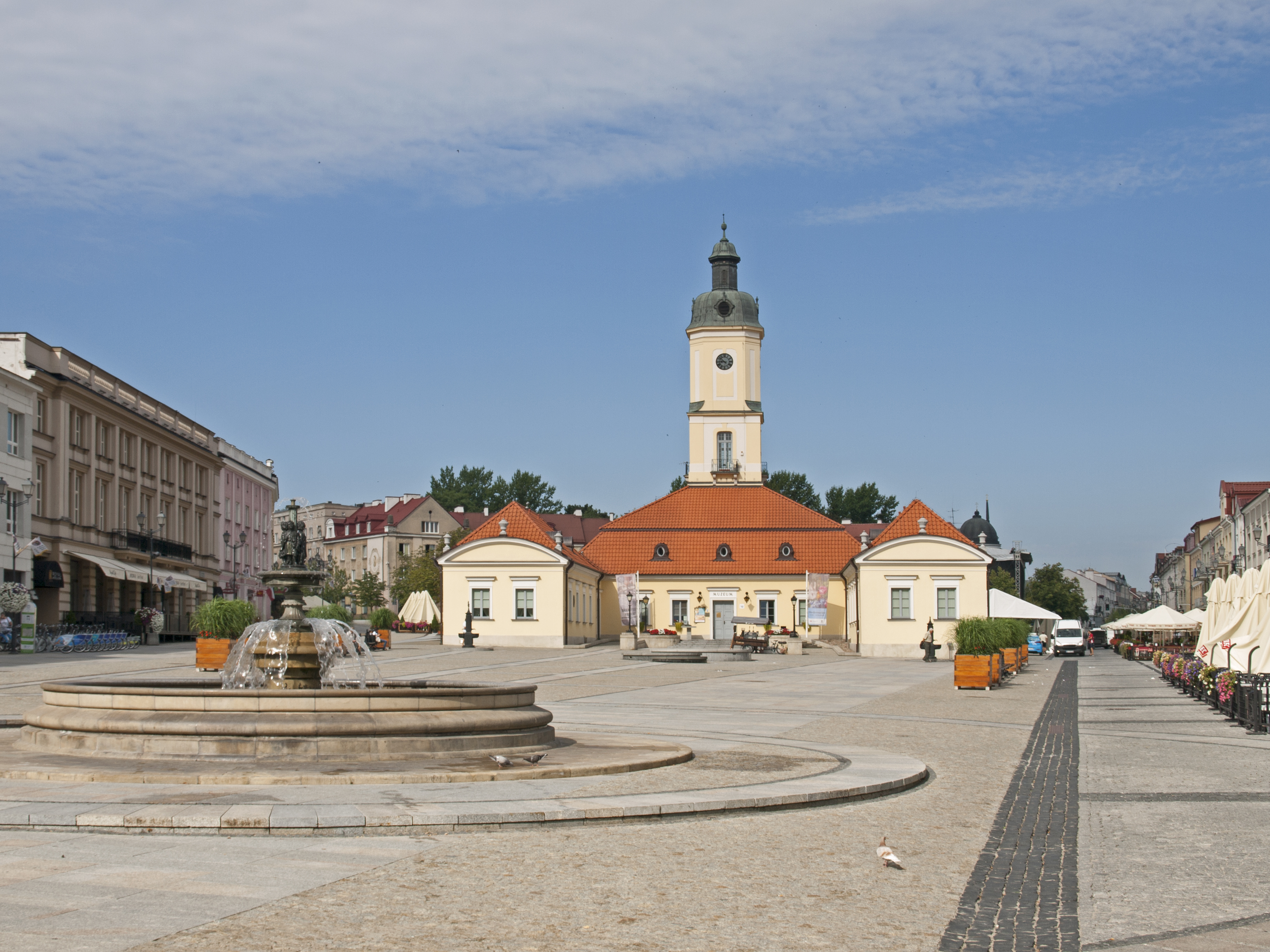
Baroque town hall in Białystok, now the Podlaskie Museum

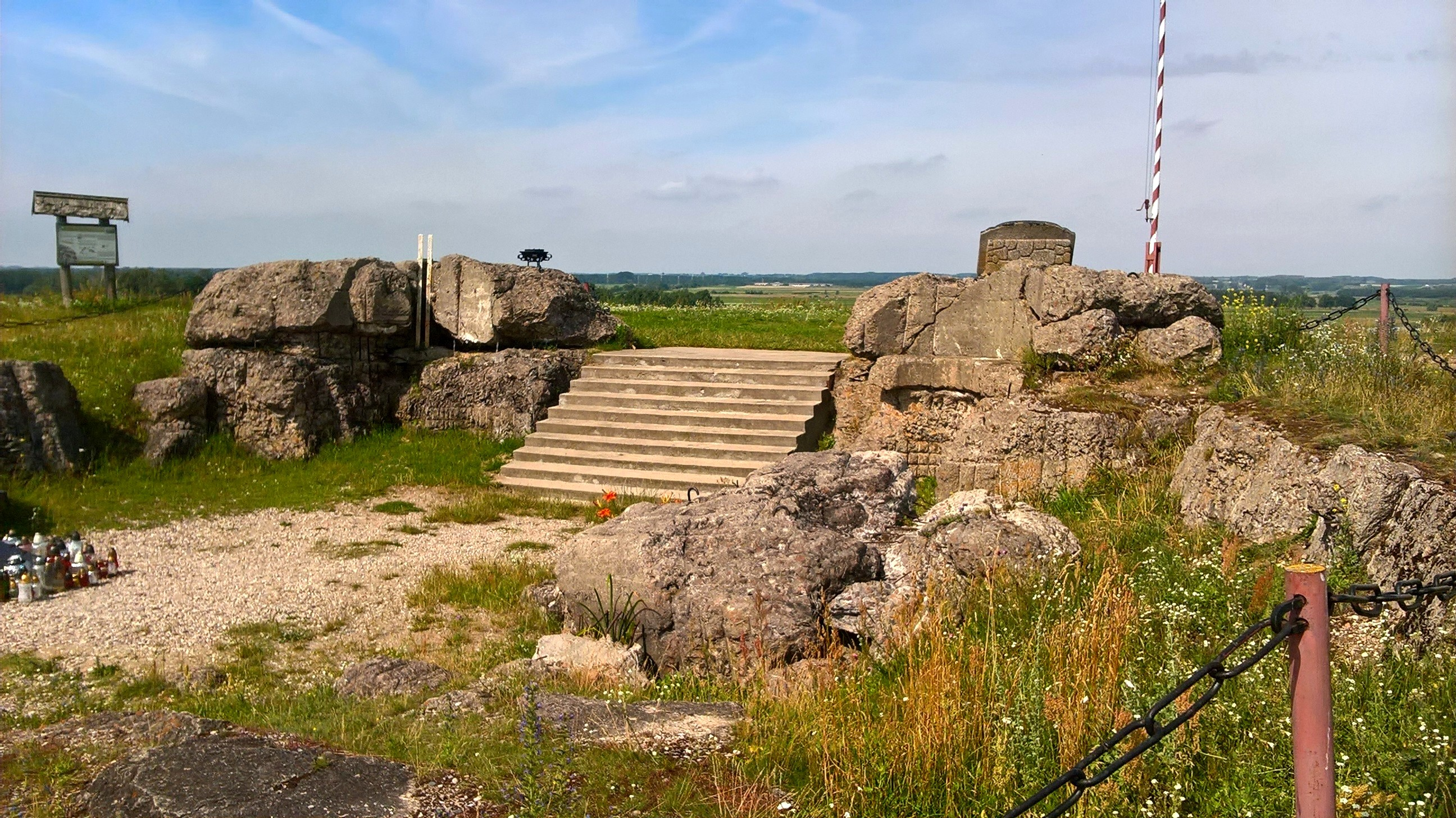
Cpt. Raginis bunker ruins in Góra Strękowa

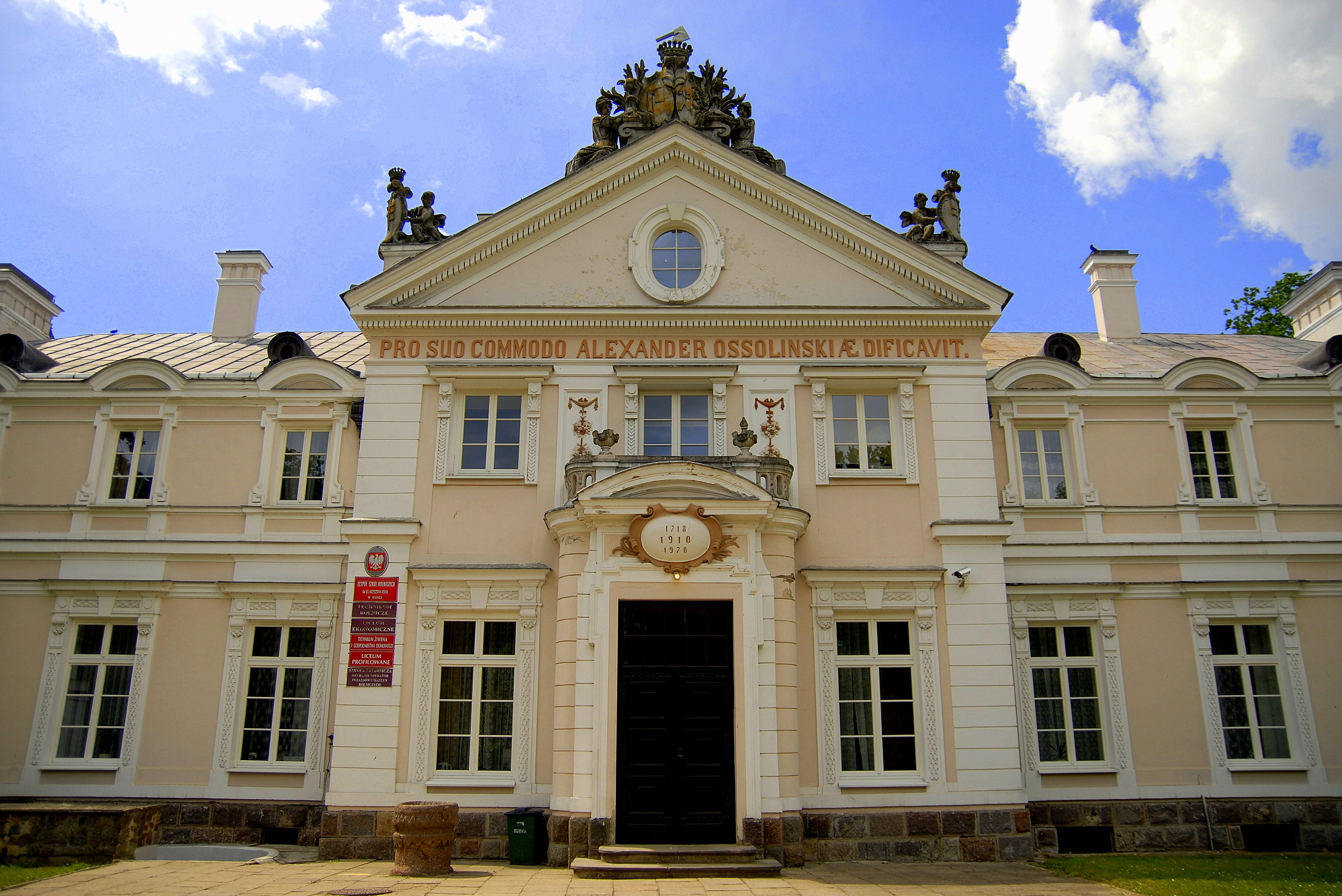
Ossoliński Palace in Rudka

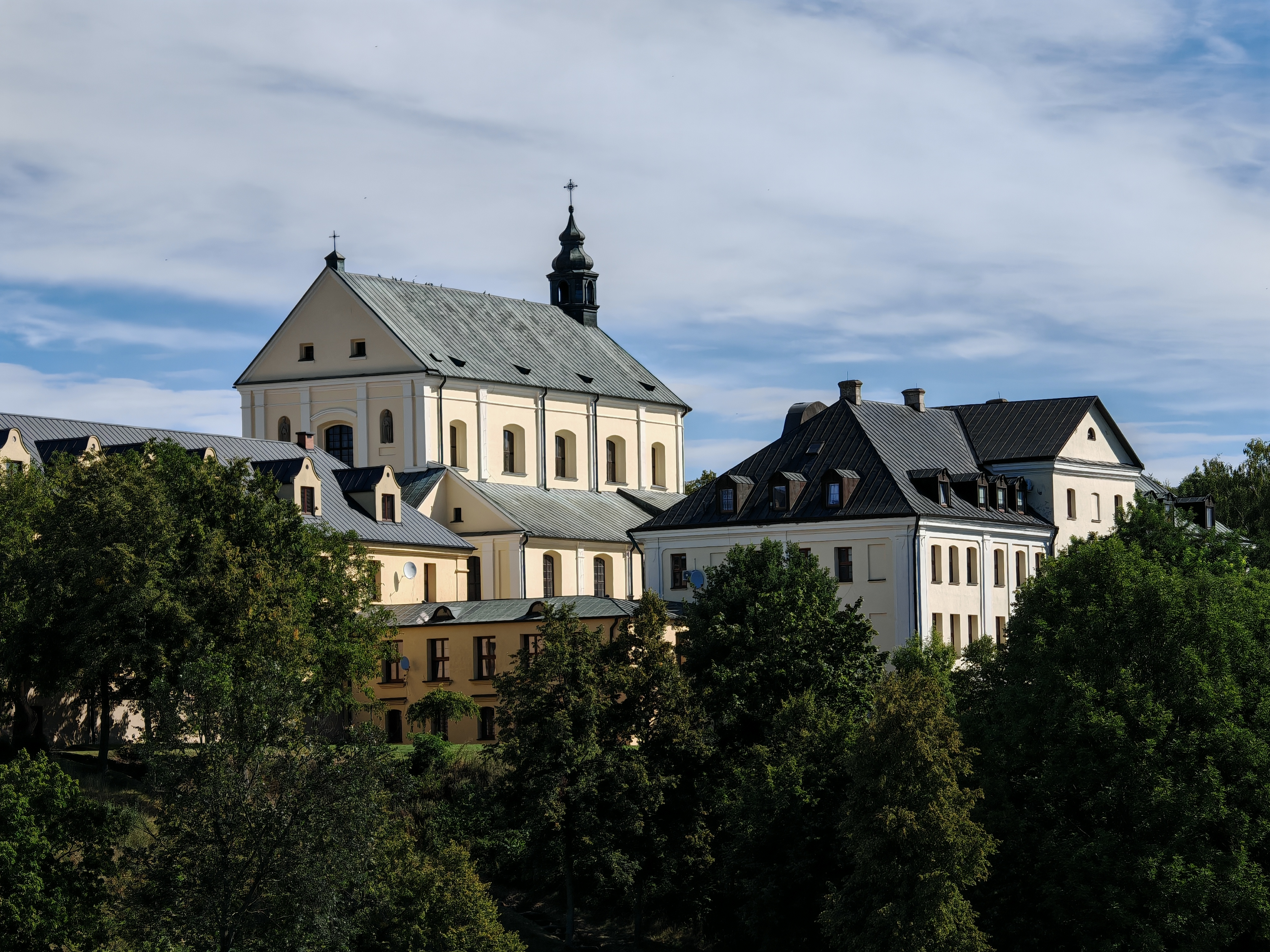
Baroque Cathedral complex in Drohiczyn

== Education ==
The chief universities of the voivodeship are the University of Białystok, Medical University of Białystok and Bialystok University of Technology. Other public colleges are the Łomża Academy and the State Vocational College in Suwałki.

== Sports ==
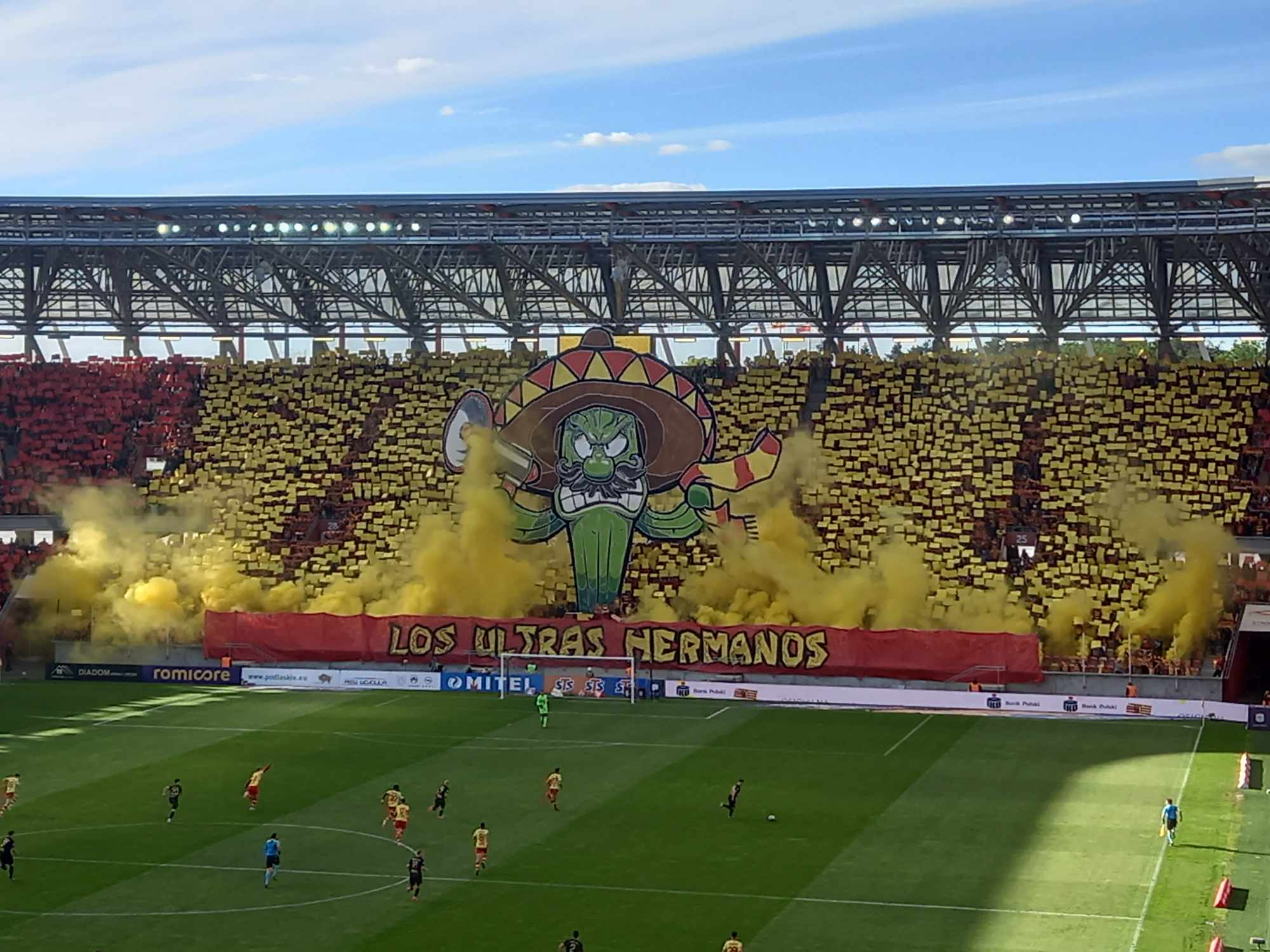
Jagiellonia Białystok football fans in 2024

Professional sports teams
Club	Sport	League	Trophies
Jagiellonia Białystok	Football (men's)	Ekstraklasa	1 Polish Championship (2024); 1 Polish Cup (2010)
Jagiellonia Białystok	Futsal (men's)	Ekstraklasa	0
Ślepsk Suwałki	Volleyball (men's)	PlusLiga	0
BAS Białystok	Volleyball (men's)	I liga	0
BAS Białystok	Volleyball (women's)	I liga	0
Lowlanders Białystok	American football	Polish Football League	3 Polish Championships (2018, 2022, 2023)
Żubry Białystok	Basketball (men's)	2 Liga	0
Tur Bielsk Podlaski	Basketball (men's)	2 Liga	0

Additionally, Podlasie Białystok is one of the top athletics clubs in the country.

== Curiosities ==
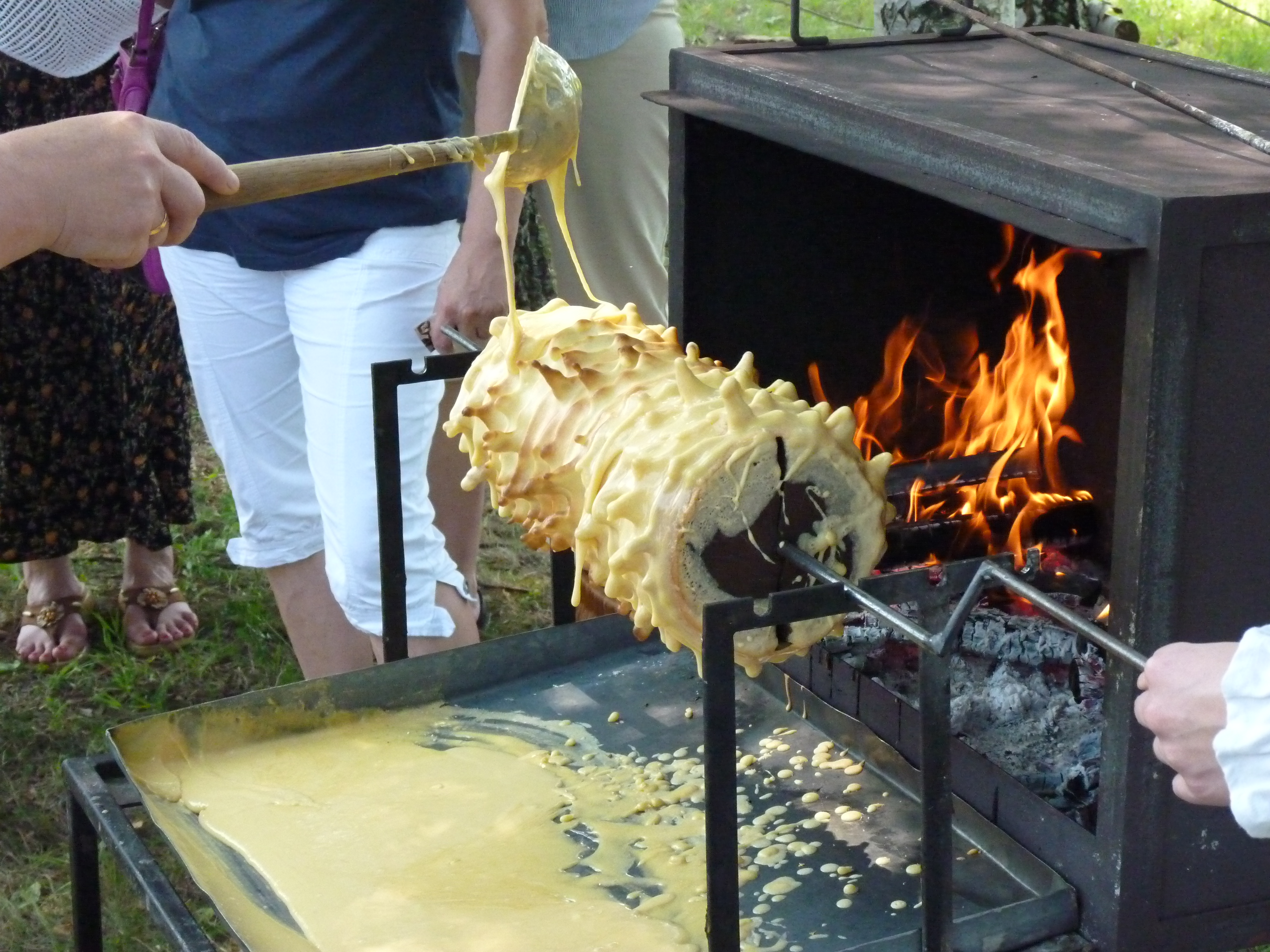
Preparation of sękacz in a traditional way

- The Suwałki Gap, an area of strategic and military importance for NATO as the only land connection between the Baltic States and members of the alliance, is located in the northern part of the voivodeship.
- A traditional food of the region is sękacz, a spit cake produced in several varieties in various places, including Piątnica, Suchowola and Sejny County.
- Krynki, Mielnik, Knyszyn and Tykocin were successively the main residential towns of the Polish kings in the region. In Krynki and Mielnik, renewals of the Polish–Lithuanian union were concluded in 1434 and 1501, respectively. At his favorite residence in Knyszyn, King Sigismund II Augustus died, ending the reign of the Jagiellonian dynasty in Poland. Tykocin, whose Old Town is designated a Historic Monument of Poland, was the place where the Order of the White Eagle, Poland's oldest and highest order, was established.
- In the northern part of the voivodeship there is a village named Szkocja, Polish for "Scotland", as it was founded for Scottish settlers.

== See also ==
- Podlaskie cuisine
