= Kozyno =

Kozyno is a name of several geographic toponyms:

- Kożyno, a village and administrative center of Gmina Bielsk Podlaski
- Kozyno, Ukraine, a village in Ivano-Frankivsk Raion, Ivano-Frankivsk Oblast, Ukraine
