= Lubin (disambiguation) =

Lubin is a city in Lower Silesian Voivodeship, south-west Poland.

Lubin may also refer to:

== People ==
- Lubin (surname)

== Places ==
=== Poland ===
- Lubin County in Lower Silesian Voivodeship (south-west Poland)
- Lubin, Kuyavian-Pomeranian Voivodeship (north-central Poland)
- Lubin, Lubusz Voivodeship (west Poland)
- Lubin, Warmian-Masurian Voivodeship (north Poland)
- Lubin, Gryfice County in West Pomeranian Voivodeship (north-west Poland)
- Lubin, Kamień County in West Pomeranian Voivodeship (north-west Poland)
- Lubiń, Gniezno County in Greater Poland Voivodeship (west-central Poland)
- Lubiń, Kościan County in Greater Poland Voivodeship (west-central Poland)
- Łubin Kościelny in Podlaskie Voivodeship (north-eastern Poland)
- Łubin Rudołty in Podlaskie Voivodeship (north-eastern Poland)

=== Germany ===
- Lübben (Spreewald), named Lubin in Sorbian and Polish, a town in Brandenburg and Lower Lusatia

== Companies ==
- Lubin Manufacturing Company, motion picture company founded by Siegmund Lubin

== See also ==
- Lu Bin (disambiguation)
