= Hołody =

- Village
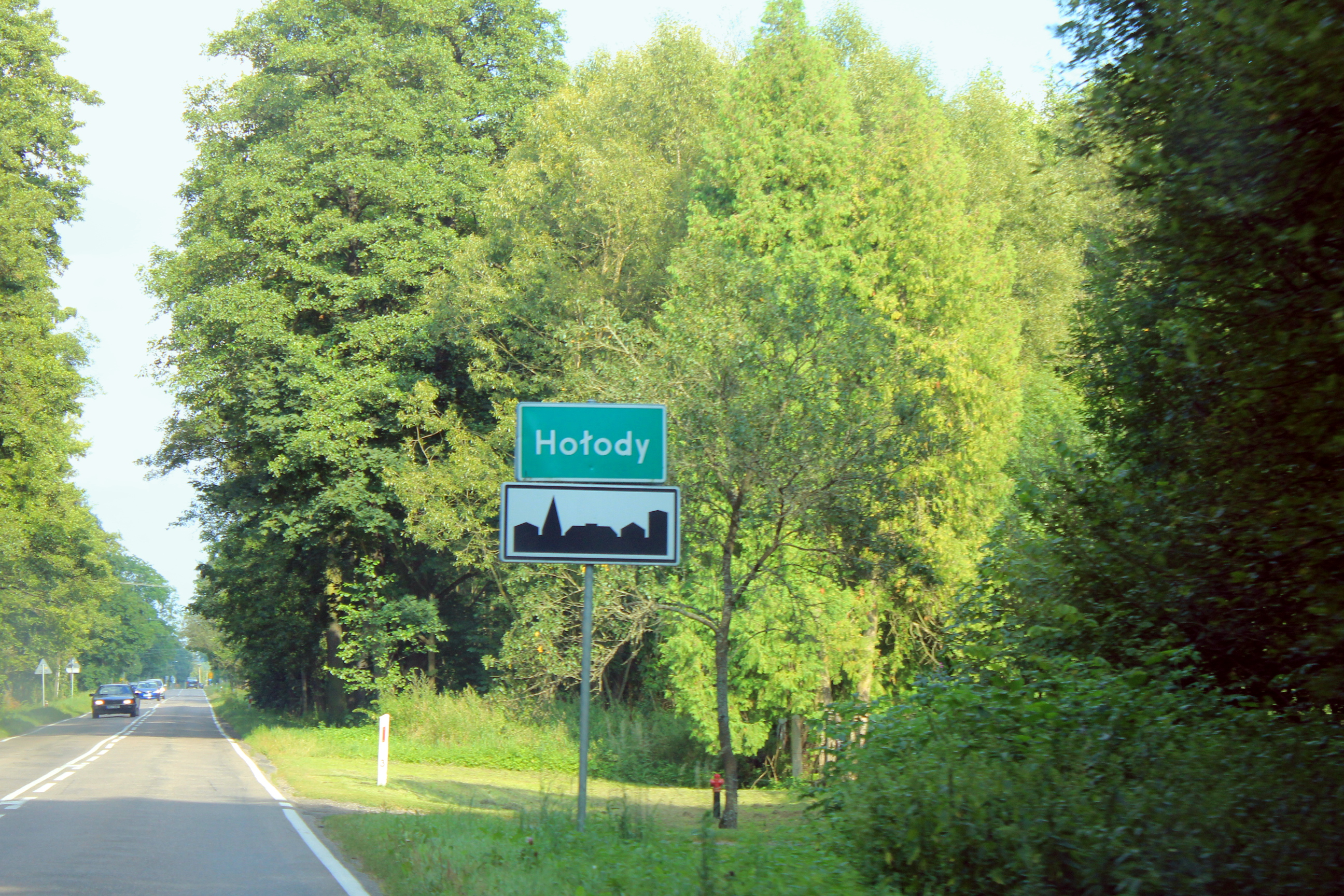

- Location within Poland
- Coordinates: 52°45′N 23°17′E
- Country: Poland
- Voivodeship: Podlaskie
- County: Bielsk
- Gmina: Bielsk Podlaski

Hołody [xɔˈwɔdɨ] is a village in the administrative district of Gmina Bielsk Podlaski, within Bielsk County, Podlaskie Voivodeship, in north-eastern Poland.
