= Knorydy Średnie =

- Village
- Location within Poland
- Coordinates: 52°42′15″N 23°6′16″E
- Country: Poland
- Voivodeship: Podlaskie
- County: Bielsk
- Gmina: Bielsk Podlaski

Knorydy Średnie [knɔˈrɨdɨ ˈɕrɛdɲɛ] is a village in the administrative district of Gmina Bielsk Podlaski, within Bielsk County, Podlaskie Voivodeship, in north-eastern Poland.
