= Dobromil, Podlaskie Voivodeship =

Dobromil
- Village
- Location within Poland
- Coordinates: 52°43′1″N 23°8′10″E
- Country: Poland
- Voivodeship: Podlaskie
- County: Bielsk
- Gmina: Bielsk Podlaski

Dobromil [dɔˈbrɔmʲil] is a village in the administrative district of Gmina Bielsk Podlaski, within Bielsk County, Podlaskie Voivodeship, in north-eastern Poland.
