= Zawady, Bielsk County =

Zawady
- Village
- Location within Poland
- Coordinates: 52°44′N 23°5′E
- Country: Poland
- Voivodeship: Podlaskie
- County: Bielsk
- Gmina: Bielsk Podlaski
- Population: 150

Zawady [zaˈvadɨ] is a village in the administrative district of Gmina Bielsk Podlaski, within Bielsk County, Podlaskie Voivodeship, in north-eastern Poland.
