= Użyki =

- Settlement
- Location within Poland
- Coordinates: 52°43′56″N 23°00′58″E
- Country: Poland
- Voivodeship: Podlaskie
- County: Bielsk
- Gmina: Bielsk Podlaski

Użyki [uˈʐɨki] is a settlement in the administrative district of Gmina Bielsk Podlaski, within Bielsk County, Podlaskie Voivodeship, in north-eastern Poland.
