= Hryniewicze Duże =

- Village
- Location within Poland
- Coordinates: 52°49′N 23°14′E
- Country: Poland
- Voivodeship: Podlaskie
- County: Bielsk
- Gmina: Bielsk Podlaski

Hryniewicze Duże [xrɨɲɛˈvʲit͡ʂɛ ˈduʐɛ] is a village in the administrative district of Gmina Bielsk Podlaski, within Bielsk County, Podlaskie Voivodeship, in north-eastern Poland.
