= Knorydy Podleśne =

- Village
- Location within Poland
- Coordinates: 52°41′17″N 23°8′36″E
- Country: Poland
- Voivodeship: Podlaskie
- County: Bielsk
- Gmina: Bielsk Podlaski

Knorydy Podleśne [knɔˈrɨdɨ pɔdˈlɛɕnɛ] is a village in the administrative district of Gmina Bielsk Podlaski, within Bielsk County, Podlaskie Voivodeship, in north-eastern Poland.

According to the 1921 census, the village was inhabited by 31 people, among whom 2 were Roman Catholic, 26 Orthodox, and 3 Mosaic. At the same time, 21 inhabitants declared Polish nationality, 10 Belarusian. There were 3 residential buildings in the village.
