= Lewki, Bielsk County =

Lewki
- Village
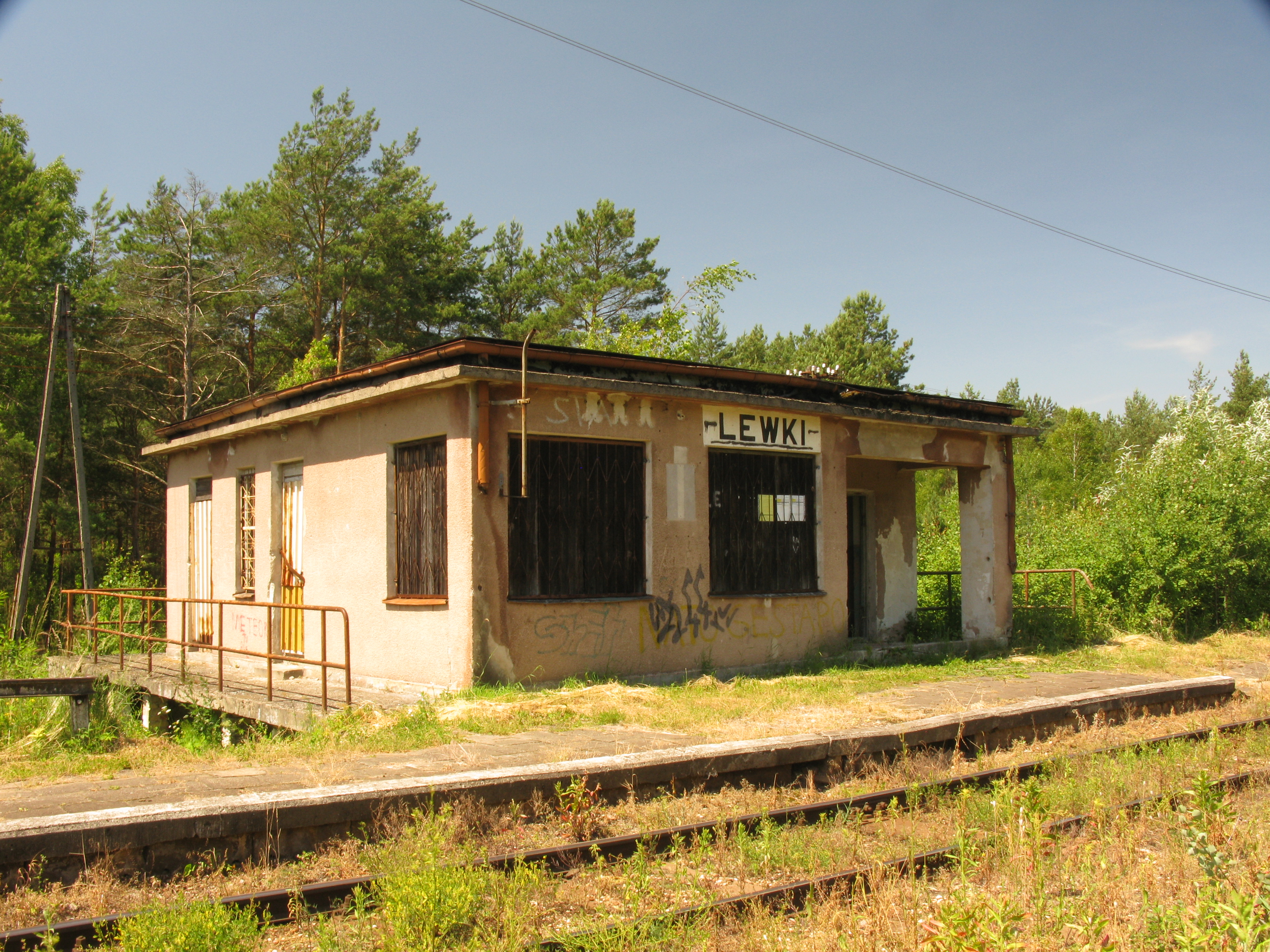
- Abandoned railway station in Lewki

- Location within Poland
- Coordinates: 52°44′N 23°13′E
- Country: Poland
- Voivodeship: Podlaskie
- County: Bielsk
- Gmina: Bielsk Podlaski

Lewki [ˈlɛfki] is a village in the administrative district of Gmina Bielsk Podlaski, within Bielsk County, Podlaskie Voivodeship, in north-eastern Poland.
