= Sobotczyzna =

- Settlement
- Location within Poland
- Coordinates: 52°43′59″N 23°02′57″E
- Country: Poland
- Voivodeship: Podlaskie
- County: Bielsk
- Gmina: Bielsk Podlaski

Sobotczyzna ([sɔbɔtˈt͡ʂɨzna]) is a settlement in the administrative district of Gmina Bielsk Podlaski, within Bielsk County, Podlaskie Voivodeship, in north-eastern Poland.
