= Rajki, Poland =

Rajki
- Village
- Location within Poland
- Coordinates: 52°43′N 23°12′E
- Country: Poland
- Voivodeship: Podlaskie
- County: Bielsk
- Gmina: Bielsk Podlaski

Rajki [ˈrai̯ki] is a village in the administrative district of Gmina Bielsk Podlaski, within Bielsk County, Podlaskie Voivodeship, in north-eastern Poland.
