= Gaj, Bielsk County =

Gaj
- Settlement
- Location within Poland
- Coordinates: 52°49′10″N 23°14′39″E
- Country: Poland
- Voivodeship: Podlaskie
- County: Bielsk
- Gmina: Bielsk Podlaski

Gaj [ɡai̯] is a settlement in the administrative district of Gmina Bielsk Podlaski, within Bielsk County, Podlaskie Voivodeship, in north-eastern Poland.
