= Stołowacz =

- Village
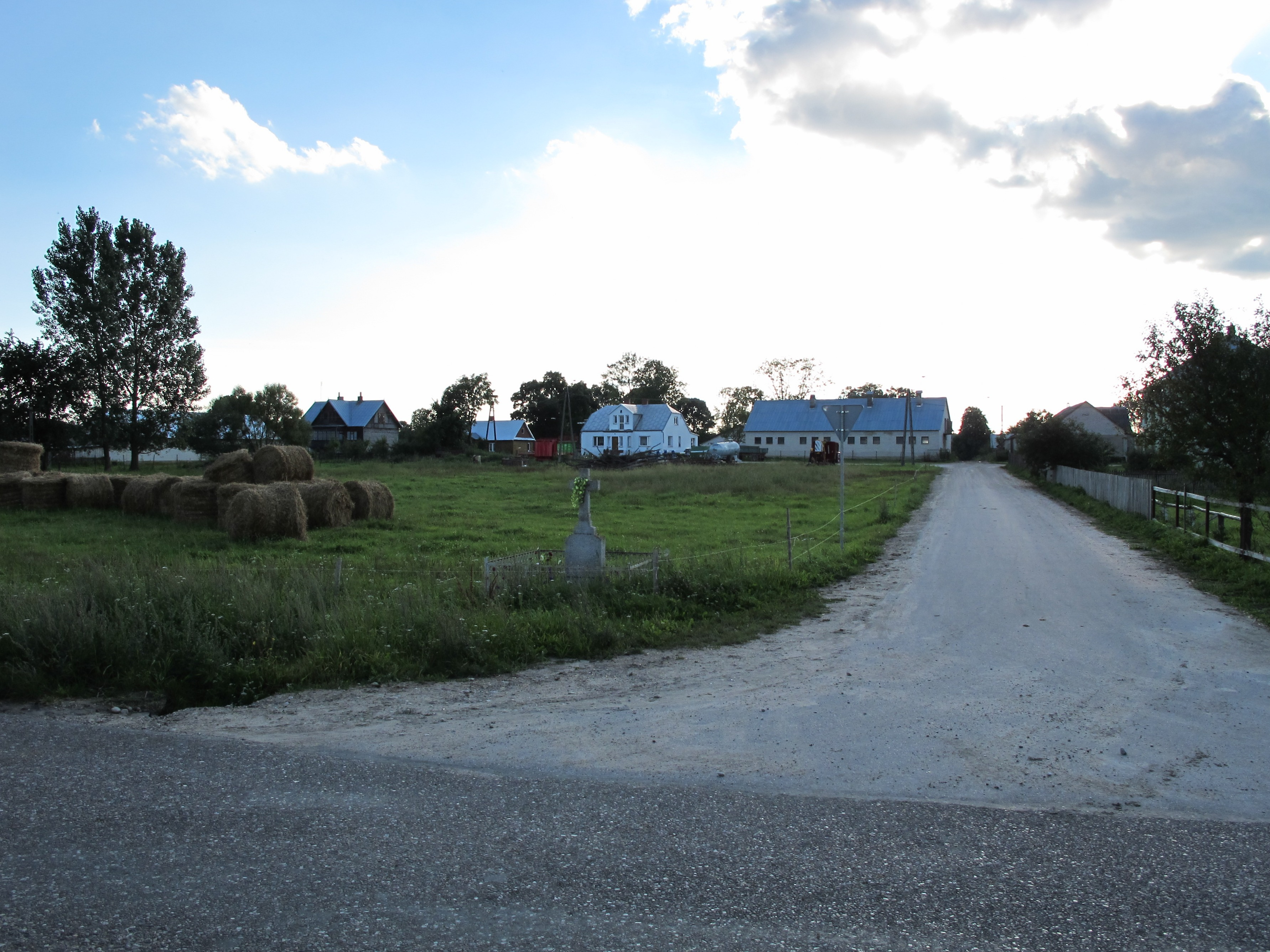

- Location within Poland
- Coordinates: 52°50′N 23°7′E
- Country: Poland
- Voivodeship: Podlaskie
- County: Bielsk
- Gmina: Bielsk Podlaski

Stołowacz [stɔˈwɔvat͡ʂ] is a village in the administrative district of Gmina Bielsk Podlaski, within Bielsk County, Podlaskie Voivodeship, in north-eastern Poland.
