= Jacewicze =

- Village
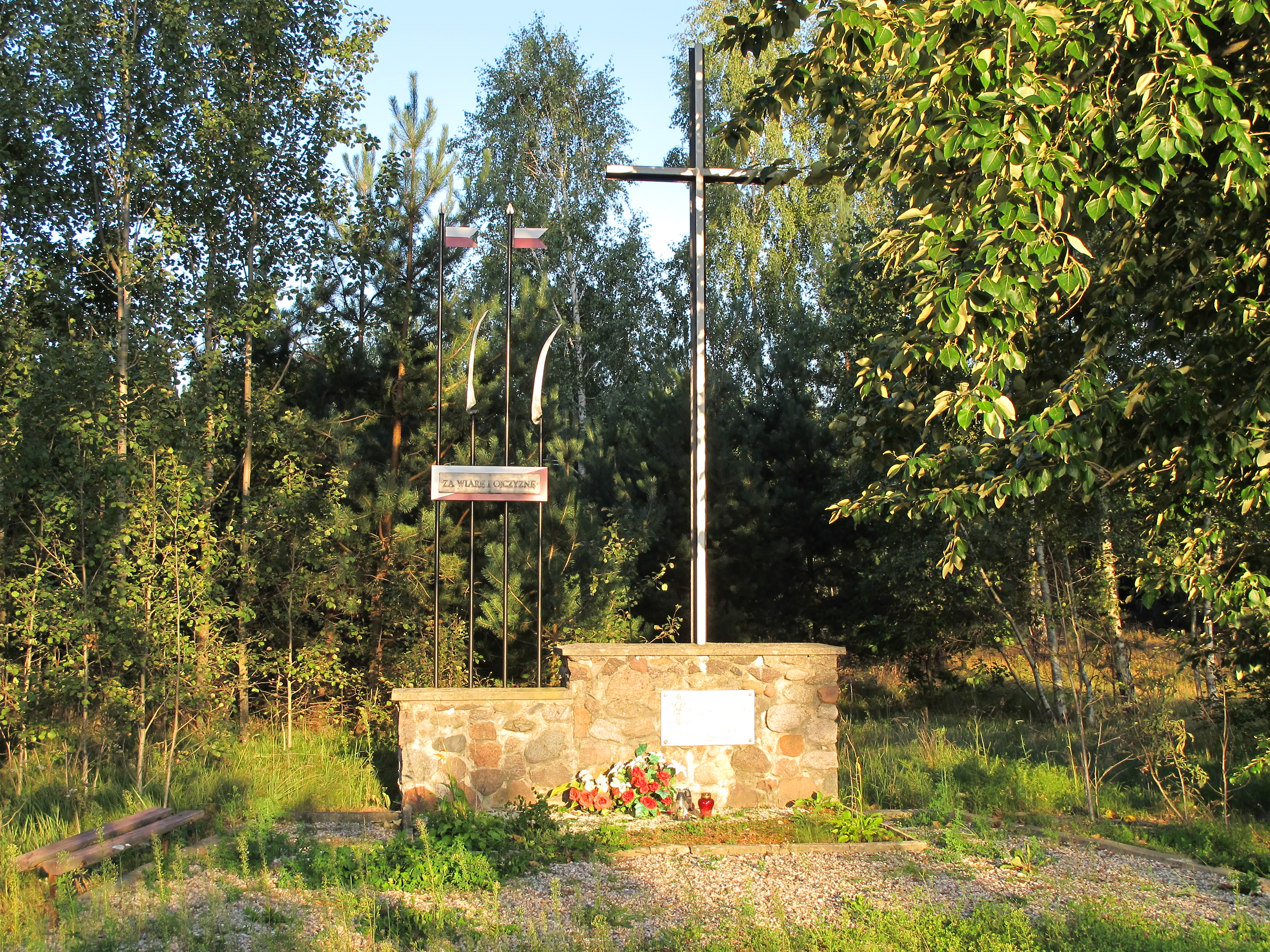
- January (1996) Uprising insurgents grave near Jacewicze village

- Location within Poland
- Coordinates: 52°53′13″N 23°06′41″E
- Country: Poland
- Voivodeship: Podlaskie
- County: Bielsk
- Gmina: Bielsk Podlaski

Jacewicze [jat͡sɛˈvit͡ʂɛ] is a village in the administrative district of Gmina Bielsk Podlaski, within Bielsk County, Podlaskie Voivodeship, in north-eastern Poland.
