= Łoknica =

- Village
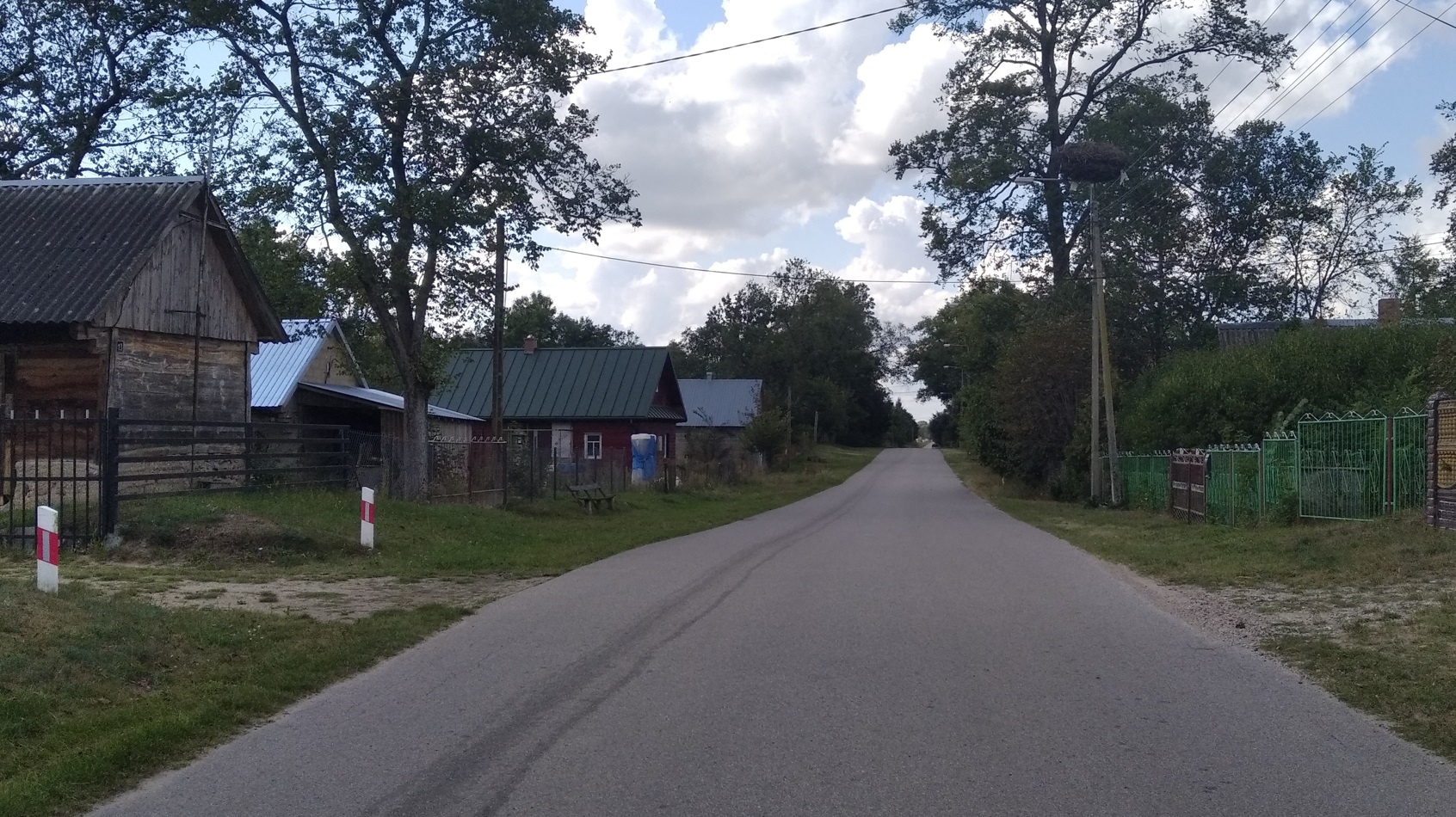

- Location within Poland
- Coordinates: 52°47′N 23°22′E
- Country: Poland
- Voivodeship: Podlaskie
- County: Bielsk
- Gmina: Bielsk Podlaski

Łoknica [wɔkˈɲit͡sa] is a village in the administrative district of Gmina Bielsk Podlaski, within Bielsk County, Podlaskie Voivodeship, in north-eastern Poland.
