= Kożyno Małe =

- Village
- Location within Poland
- Coordinates: 52°52′22″N 23°18′53″E
- Country: Poland
- Voivodeship: Podlaskie
- County: Bielsk
- Gmina: Bielsk Podlaski
- Population: 140

Kożyno Małe [kɔˈʐɨnɔ ˈmawɛ] is a village in the administrative district of Gmina Bielsk Podlaski, within Bielsk County, Podlaskie Voivodeship, in north-eastern Poland.
