= Ogrodniki =

Ogrodniki may refer to:

- Ogrodniki, Gmina Biała Podlaska in Lublin Voivodeship (east Poland)
- Ogrodniki, Gmina Tuczna in Lublin Voivodeship (east Poland)
- Ogrodniki, Białystok County in Podlaskie Voivodeship (north-east Poland)
- Ogrodniki, Bielsk County in Podlaskie Voivodeship (north-east Poland)
- Ogrodniki, Hajnówka County in Podlaskie Voivodeship (north-east Poland)
- Ogrodniki, Mońki County in Podlaskie Voivodeship (north-east Poland)
- Ogrodniki, Sejny County in Podlaskie Voivodeship (north-east Poland)
- Ogrodniki, Siemiatycze County in Podlaskie Voivodeship (north-east Poland)
- Ogrodniki, Sokółka County in Podlaskie Voivodeship (north-east Poland)
- Ogrodniki, Siedlce County in Masovian Voivodeship (east-central Poland)
- Ogrodniki, Węgrów County in Masovian Voivodeship (east-central Poland)
- Ogrodniki, Warmian-Masurian Voivodeship (north Poland)
