= Saki, Bielsk County =

Saki
- Village
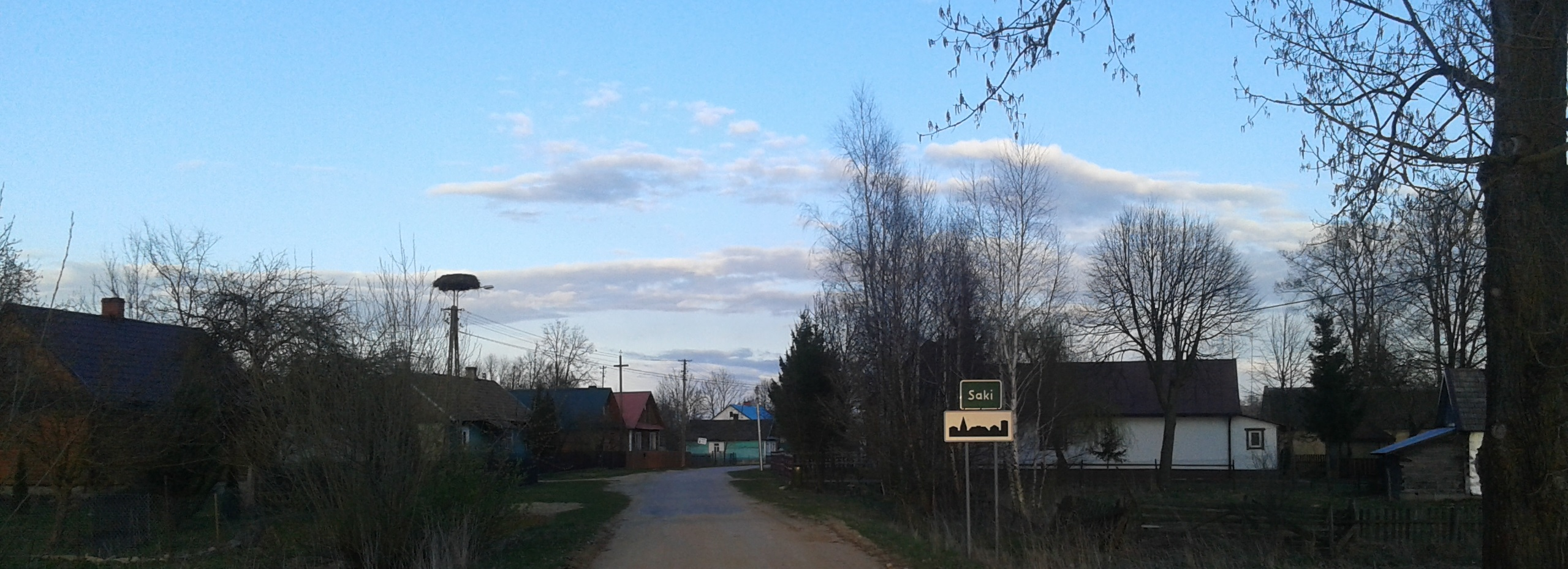
- Sunset in Saki

- Location within Poland
- Coordinates: 52°51′30″N 23°09′30″E
- Country: Poland
- Voivodeship: Podlaskie
- County: Bielsk
- Gmina: Bielsk Podlaski

Saki (Polish pronunciation: [ˈsakʲi]) is a village in the administrative district of Gmina Bielsk Podlaski, within Bielsk County, Podlaskie Voivodeship, in north-eastern Poland.
