= Koszarka =

- Settlement
- Location within Poland
- Coordinates: 52°52′02″N 23°15′56″E
- Country: Poland
- Voivodeship: Podlaskie
- County: Bielsk
- Gmina: Bielsk Podlaski

Koszarka [kɔˈʂarka] is a settlement in the administrative district of Gmina Bielsk Podlaski, within Bielsk County, Podlaskie Voivodeship, in north-eastern Poland.
