= Deniski =

- Village
- Location within Poland
- Coordinates: 52°53′N 23°12′E
- Country: Poland
- Voivodeship: Podlaskie
- County: Bielsk
- Gmina: Bielsk Podlaski

Deniski [dɛˈɲiskʲi] is a village in the administrative district of Gmina Bielsk Podlaski, within Bielsk County, Podlaskie Voivodeship, in north-eastern Poland.

== Transport ==
The S19 expressway currently terminates just to the east of Deniski. It will be extended north to Białystok sometime in the future.

The nearest railway station is in Bielsk Podlaski.
