= Brześcianka =

- Village
- Location within Poland
- Coordinates: 52°47′12″N 22°59′38″E
- Country: Poland
- Voivodeship: Podlaskie
- County: Bielsk
- Gmina: Bielsk Podlaski

Brześcianka [bʐɛɕˈt͡ɕaŋka] is a village in the administrative district of Gmina Bielsk Podlaski, within Bielsk County, Podlaskie Voivodeship, in north-eastern Poland.
