= Na Brańskiej =

- Settlement
- Location within Poland
- Coordinates: 52°42′51″N 23°10′00″E
- Country: Poland
- Voivodeship: Podlaskie
- County: Bielsk
- Gmina: Bielsk Podlaski

Na Brańskiej [ˈna ˈbraɲskʲɛj] is a settlement in the administrative district of Gmina Bielsk Podlaski within Bielsk County, Podlaskie Voivodeship in north-eastern Poland.
