= Lubina =

Lubina may refer to:

- Lubina, Slovakia, a municipality and village
- Lubina (river), a river in the Czech Republic
- Lubina, a village and part of Kopřivnice in the Czech Republic
- Anela Lubina, Croatian footballer
- Janicel Lubina, Filipino beauty pageant titleholder and actress
- Ladislav Lubina, Czech ice hockey player and coach
- Paweł Lubina, Polish footballer

== See also ==
- Lubin (disambiguation)
