= Haćki =

- Village
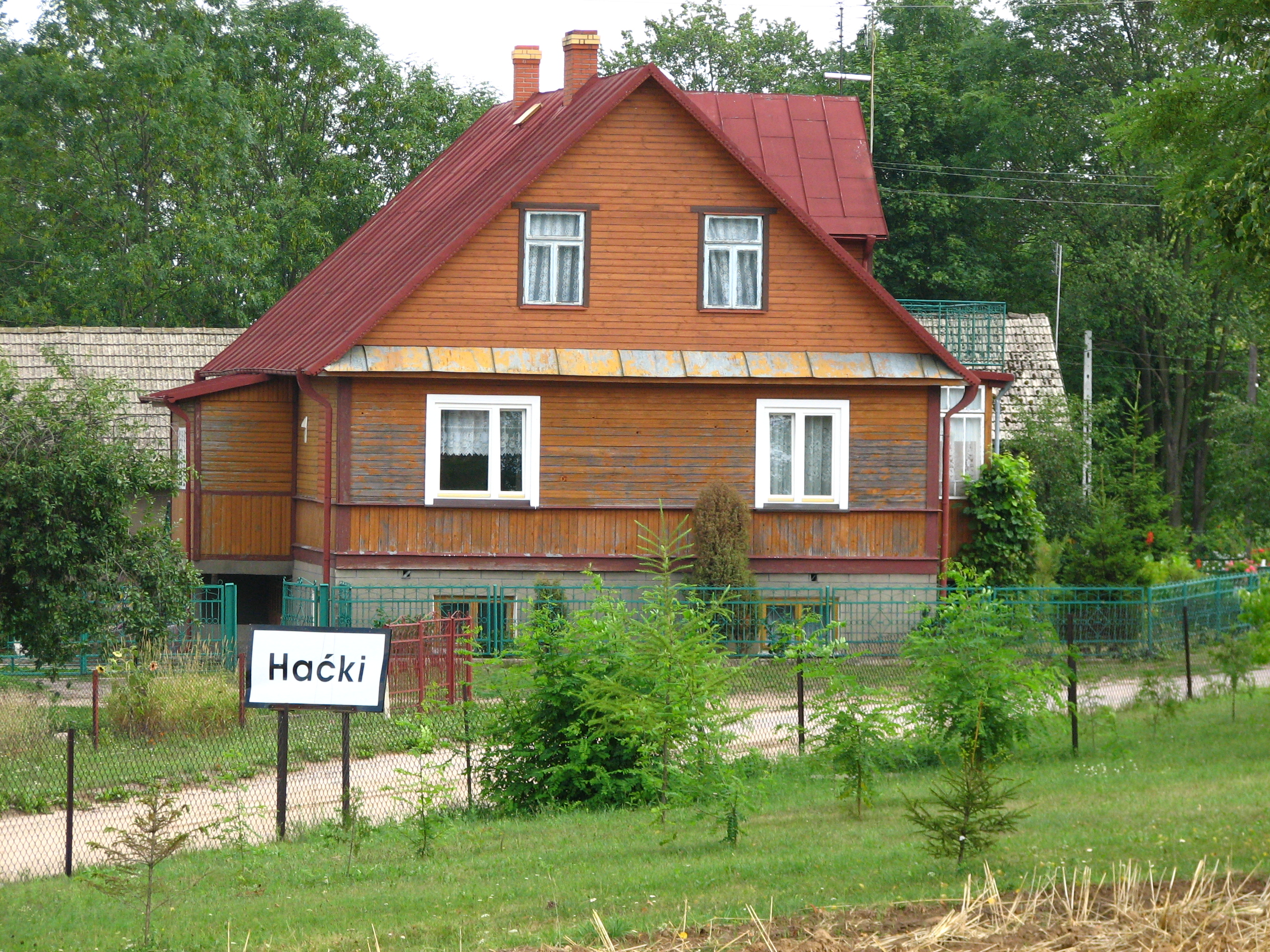

- Location within Poland
- Coordinates: 52°50′06″N 23°11′35″E
- Country: Poland
- Voivodeship: Podlaskie
- County: Bielsk
- Gmina: Bielsk Podlaski

Haćki [ˈxat͡ɕki] is a village in the administrative district of Gmina Bielsk Podlaski, within Bielsk County, Podlaskie Voivodeship, in north-eastern Poland.
