= Knorydy =

- Village
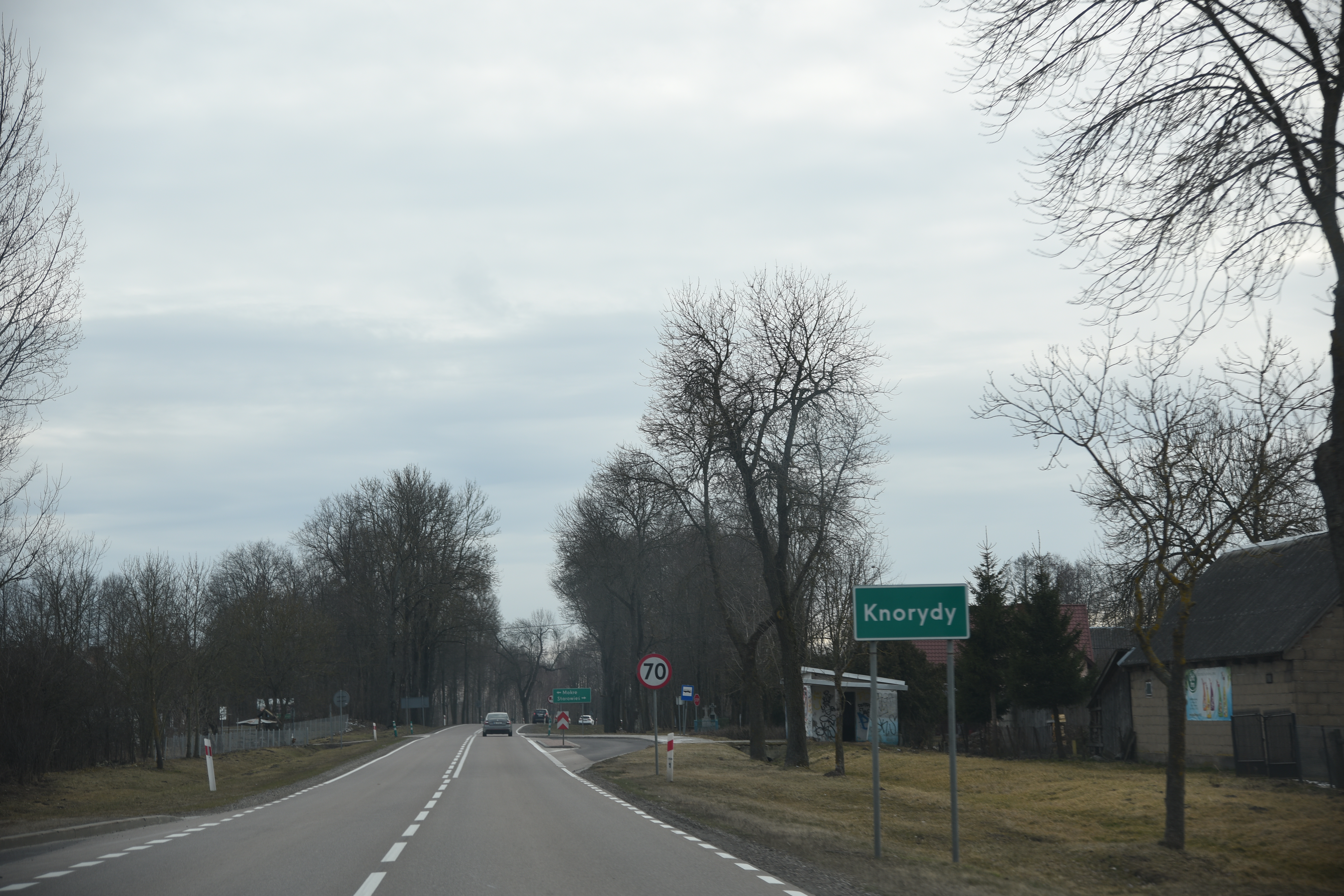

- Location within Poland
- Coordinates: 52°42′N 23°8′E
- Country: Poland
- Voivodeship: Podlaskie
- County: Bielsk
- Gmina: Bielsk Podlaski
- Population: 430

Knorydy [knɔˈrɨdɨ] is a village in the administrative district of Gmina Bielsk Podlaski, within Bielsk County, Podlaskie Voivodeship, in north-eastern Poland.
