= Ploski =

- Village
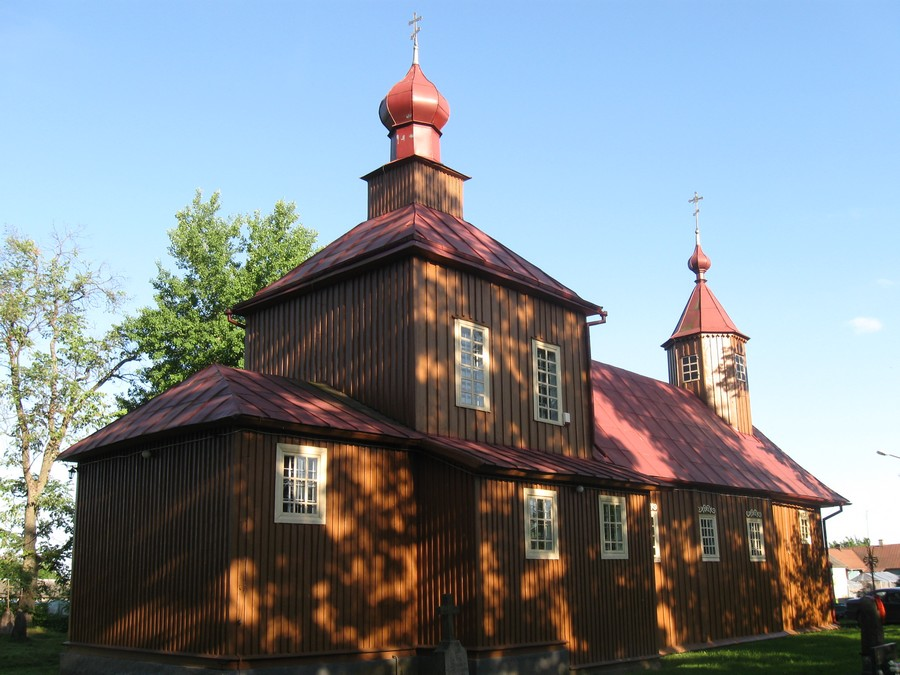

- Location within Poland
- Coordinates: 52°53′N 23°15′E
- Country: Poland
- Voivodeship: Podlaskie
- County: Bielsk
- Gmina: Bielsk Podlaski

Ploski [ˈplɔski] is a village in the administrative district of Gmina Bielsk Podlaski, within Bielsk County, Podlaskie Voivodeship, in north-eastern Poland.

== Etymology ==
The name of the village comes from "plosa" which means "Gulf".

== History ==
The village was established in sixteenth century.

== Places of worship ==
=== Transfiguration Church / Icons of Our Lady of Kazańskiej Chapel - Polish Orthodox ===
Built in the nineteenth century. On the left from the gate to the church is a small Chapel which was built in 1863.

=== Chapel of Saint Łukasz - Polish Orthodox ===
Cemetery chapel outside of town, built in 1955.
