= Miękisze =

- Village
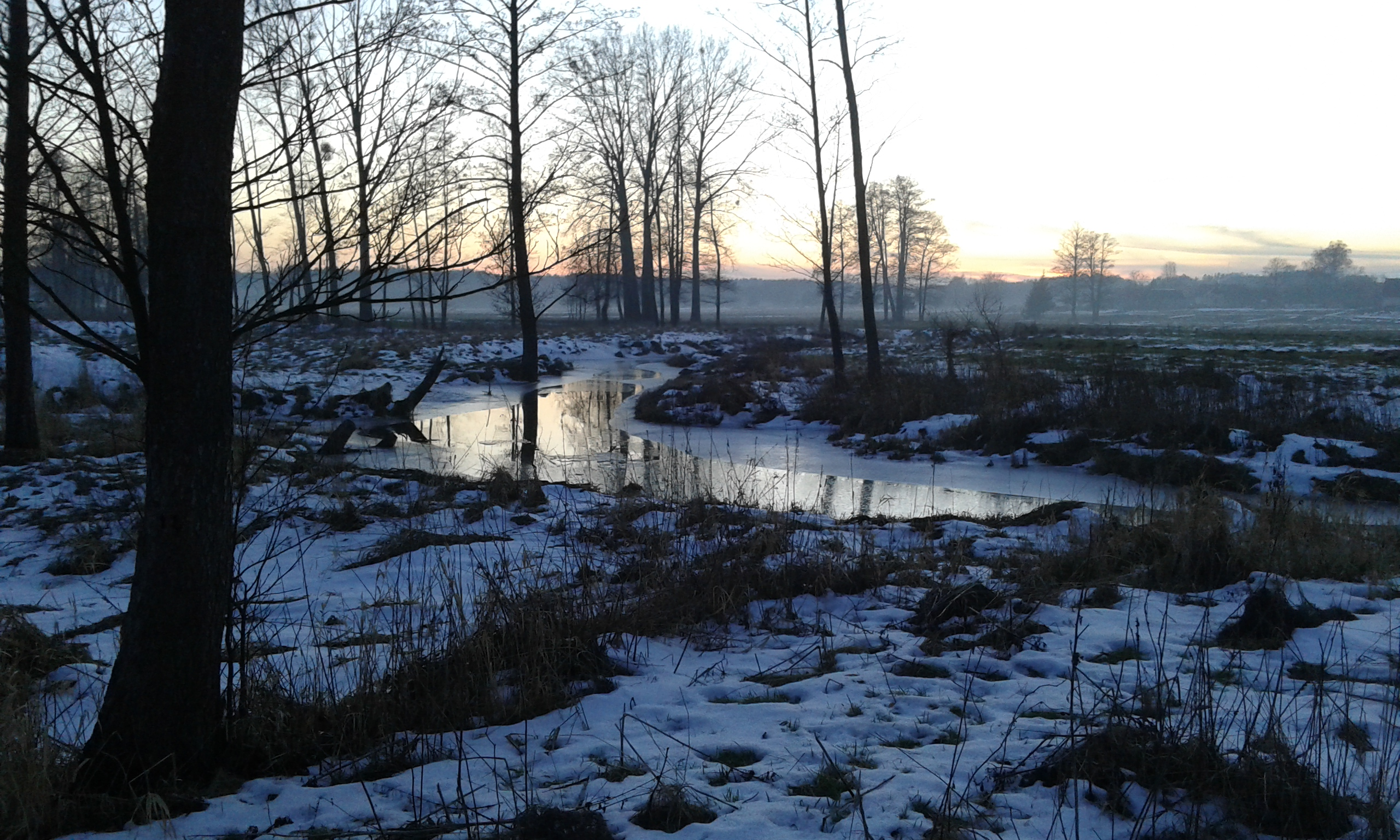
- View of a pond in Miękisze during winter

- Location within Poland
- Coordinates: 52°48′03″N 23°20′40″E
- Country: Poland
- Voivodeship: Podlaskie
- County: Bielsk
- Gmina: Bielsk Podlaski

Miękisze [mʲɛŋˈkʲiʂɛ] is a village in the administrative district of Gmina Bielsk Podlaski, within Bielsk County, Podlaskie Voivodeship, in north-eastern Poland.
