= Krzywa =

Krzywa may refer to the following places in Poland:

- Krzywa, Lower Silesian Voivodeship (south-west Poland)
- Krzywa, Bielsk County in Podlaskie Voivodeship (north-east Poland)
- Krzywa, Mońki County in Podlaskie Voivodeship (north-east Poland)
- Krzywa, Sokółka County in Podlaskie Voivodeship (north-east Poland)
- Krzywa, Lesser Poland Voivodeship (south Poland)
- Krzywa, Subcarpathian Voivodeship (south-east Poland)
- Krzywa, Lubusz Voivodeship (west Poland)
