= Grabowiec, Bielsk County =

Grabowiec
- Village
- Location within Poland
- Coordinates: 52°45′N 23°3′E
- Country: Poland
- Voivodeship: Podlaskie
- County: Bielsk
- Gmina: Bielsk Podlaski

Grabowiec [ɡraˈbɔvʲɛt͡s] is a village in the administrative district of Gmina Bielsk Podlaski, within Bielsk County, Podlaskie Voivodeship, in north-eastern Poland.
