= Anatol Firsowicz =

Polish serial killer

- Born: 11 February 1956; Widowo, Podlaskie Voivodeship, Polish People's Republic
- Died: 12 November 2004 (aged 48); Warsaw, Masovian Voivodeship, Poland
- Other name: "The Podlasie Strangler"
- Convictions: Murder x3 Theft; Burglary
- Penalty: 25 years imprisonment

Details
- Victims: 3
- Span of crimes: 1971–1977
- Country: Poland
- State: Podlaskie
- Date apprehended: November 1977

Anatol Firsowicz (11 February 1956 – 12 November 2004), known as the Podlasie Strangler (Polish: Dusiciel z Podlasia), was a Polish serial killer who strangled two teenage girls and one adult woman in Podlaskie Voivodeship from 1971 to 1977. Sentenced to 25 years imprisonment and 10 years deprivation of civil rights, he was released from prison and died a free man in 2004.

== Early life ==
Firsowicz was born on 11 February 1956, in Widowo, a village near Bielsk Podlaski. His father was an alcoholic who systematically abused other family members both physically and mentally, which greatly affected his son. Firsowicz was considered an introvert who shied away from his peers, was a poor student who had to repeat a class three times and eventually turned towards burglaries and thefts. At around this time, he became obsessed with sex.

== Murders ==
A month before his fifteenth birthday, on 9 January 1971, Firsowicz noticed 10-year-old Antonina Weremiejuk walking home from school. Intent on raping her, he caught up with the girl and asked Weremiejuk to accompany him on the pretence of showing her a hare he had caught in some snares. She accompanied by Firsowicz to some nearby fields, whereupon she was attacked by her companion. Weremiejuk defended herself fiercely, which caused Firsowicz to strangle her with a piece of wire, without raping her. He then buried her corpse under a hay barrack, with her body remaining undiscovered until his arrest. A year after this murder, Firsowicz was sent to a reformatory for theft and burglary.

After leaving the reformatory in 1975, Firsowicz found employment in a repairing company, and in August of that year, he was ordered to do repairs on a school in Siemiatycze. On 26 August 1976, Firsowicz walked around town looking for a woman to have sex with - after he failed to find one, he set his sights on 14-year-old Teresa Olszowy, whom he began to pester in a vulgar manner. Olszowy attempted to run away, but Firsowicz caught up with her, dragged her to the nearby woods, tore off her blouse and then strangled her with it. He then buried the victim's corpse in a nearby forest, and two weeks later, someone left a letter at the local church, claiming to have found the girl's body. The letter described the exact location, after which the priest gave the letter to the police. Olszowy's body was found on 15 September 1976, but the author of the letter was never conclusively identified.

In April 1977, Firsowicz enlisted in the Navy, attaining the rank of senior sailor. He served in Świnoujście, but in October, he was allowed to take temporary leave and visit his family in Widowo. On the night of 1 November, while in Bielsk Podlaski, he murdered 19-year-old Barbara Iwaniuk, a student whom he came across at the train station. After he attempted to rape her, Firsowicz strangled her with a rope and then left her corpse on the bank of the Biała River, where it was found the next day. When examining the crime scene, officers found a man's jacket.

== Arrest and confessions ==
After the militiamen collected evidence and left the crime scene, Firsowicz returned to search for his jacket. As he was dressed in his Navy uniform, local residents who had seen him at the train station took notice and later informed the investigators. As a result, they requested the names of every soldier in Bielsk Podlaskie who was on leave - the only one currently was one Anatol Firsowicz. Shortly afterwards, he was arrested and identified as the prime suspect, as a military dog found his scent at the crime scene and the cord with which Iwaniuk had been strangled was found in his parents' house. After the evidence was presented, Firsowicz admitted guilt not only to her murder but to those of Weremiejuk and Olszowy as well. He said that he had planned to rape each of them, but failed each time and then killed them instead. Following his confessions, he revealed where he had buried Weremiejuk's corpse.

== Trial, imprisonment, and after release ==
On 14 January 1980, the Provincial Court sentenced to 25 years imprisonment and 10 years of deprivation of civil rights. While the prosecutor demanded that he be sentenced to death, the court took into account testimony from psychiatrists who proclaimed that at the time of the crimes, Firsowicz was mentally impaired and unable to control his behaviour. He served his sentence at a prison in Strzelce Opolskie, where he remained until 27 April 1994, when he was granted parole for good behaviour.

After leaving the penitentiary, Firsowicz returned to Widowo. Angered locals beat him up on several occasions, causing him to fear for his life up to the point of donning disguises and a fake beard while going shopping. Eventually, he moved to Warsaw, where he lived in relative obscurity. Firsowicz died from natural causes on 12 November 2004, and was buried in the Northern Communal Cemetery.

== See also ==
- List of serial killers by country
- List of youngest killers
