= Augustowo, Podlaskie Voivodeship =

Augustowo
- Village
- Location within Poland
- Coordinates: 52°47′N 23°8′E
- Country: Poland
- Voivodeship: Podlaskie
- County: Bielsk
- Gmina: Bielsk Podlaski

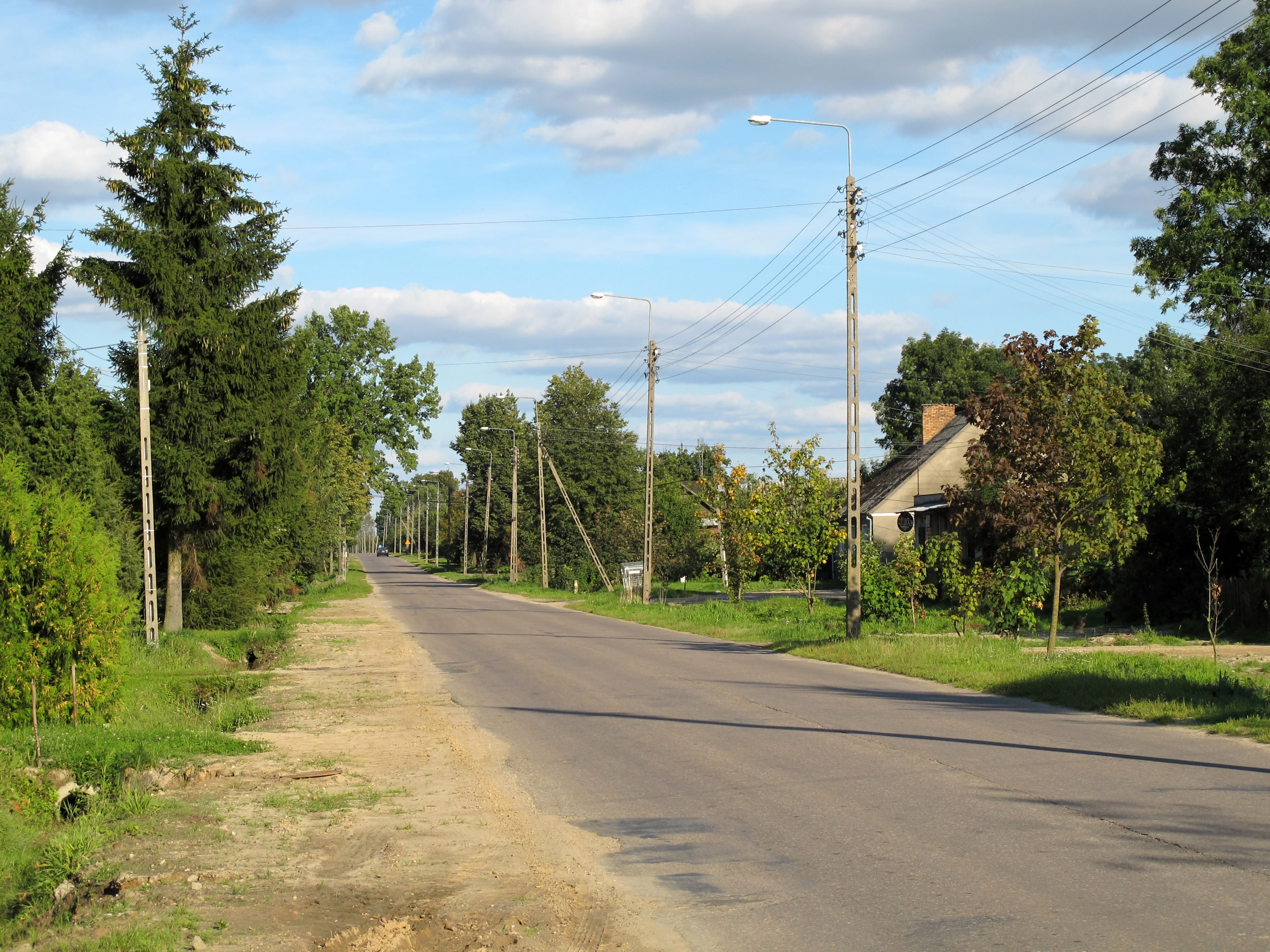
Augustowo village, Bielsk Podlaski commune, Podlaskie, Poland

Augustowo [auɡusˈtɔvɔ] is a village in the administrative district of Gmina Bielsk Podlaski, within Bielsk County, Podlaskie Voivodeship, in north-eastern Poland.
