= Podbiele, Podlaskie Voivodeship =

Podbiele
- Settlement
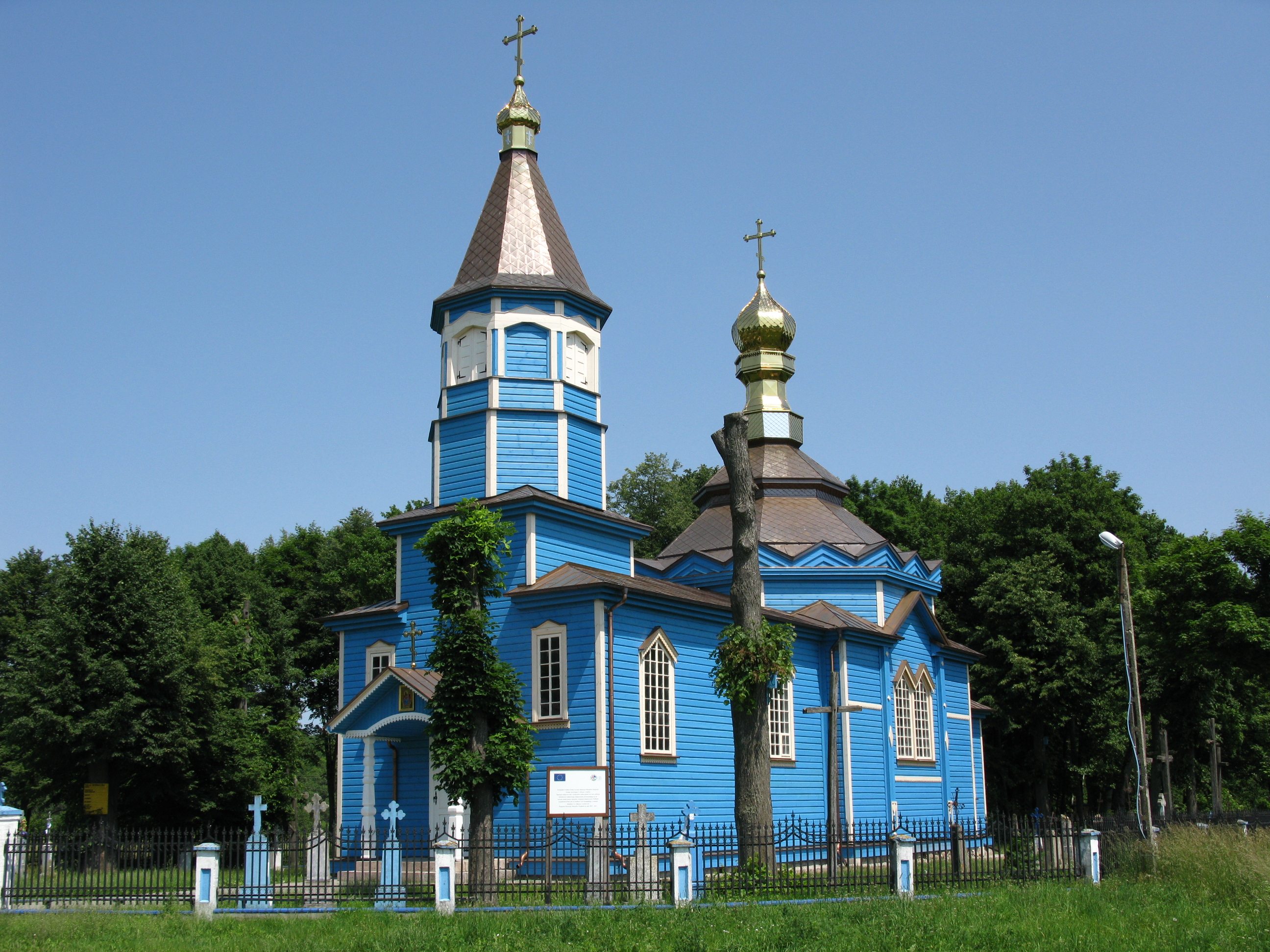
- Elijah the Prophet church in Podbiele

- Location within Poland
- Coordinates: 52°53′57″N 23°08′05″E
- Country: Poland
- Voivodeship: Podlaskie
- County: Bielsk
- Gmina: Bielsk Podlaski

Podbiele [pɔdˈbjɛlɛ] is a settlement in the administrative district of Gmina Bielsk Podlaski, within Bielsk County, Podlaskie Voivodeship, in north-eastern Poland.

According to the 1921 census, the village was inhabited by 54 people, among whom 21 were Roman Catholic, 29 Orthodox, and 4 Mosaic. At the same time, 25 inhabitants declared Polish nationality, 29 Belarusian. There were 9 residential buildings in the village.
