= Pietrzykowo-Gołąbki =

Village in Gmina Bielsk Podlaski, Poland

- Village
- Location within Poland
- Coordinates: 52°44′01″N 23°06′33″E
- Country: Poland
- Voivodeship: Podlaskie
- County: Bielsk
- Gmina: Bielsk Podlaski

Pietrzykowo-Gołąbki [pjɛtʂɨˈkɔvɔ ɡɔˈwɔmpki] is a village in the administrative district of Gmina Bielsk Podlaski, within Bielsk County, Podlaskie Voivodeship, in north-eastern Poland.
