= Orlanka, Podlaskie Voivodeship =

Orlanka
- Settlement
- Location within Poland
- Coordinates: 52°55′N 23°9′E
- Country: Poland
- Voivodeship: Podlaskie
- County: Bielsk
- Gmina: Bielsk Podlaski

Orlanka [ɔrˈlaŋka] is a settlement in the administrative district of Gmina Bielsk Podlaski, within Bielsk County, Podlaskie Voivodeship, in north-eastern Poland.
