= Bolesty =

Bolesty may refer to the following places:

- Bolesty, Masovian Voivodeship (east-central Poland)
- Bolesty, Bielsk County in Podlaskie Voivodeship (north-east Poland)
- Bolesty, Suwałki County in Podlaskie Voivodeship (north-east Poland)
