= Dwór, Podlaskie Voivodeship =

Dwór
- Settlement
- Location within Poland
- Coordinates: 52°49′30″N 23°14′30″E
- Country: Poland
- Voivodeship: Podlaskie
- County: Bielsk
- Gmina: Bielsk Podlaski

Dwór [dvur] is a settlement in the administrative district of Gmina Bielsk Podlaski, within Bielsk County, Podlaskie Voivodeship, in north-eastern Poland. The etymology of its name means manor house.
