= Ryszard Tur =

Mayor of Białystok
- In office 1998 – 5 December 2006
- Preceded by: Krzysztof Jurgiel
- Succeeded by: Tadeusz Truskolaski

Personal details
- Born: 10 August 1944 Piliki, Poland
- Party: Christian National Union
- Other political affiliations: Agreement
- Education: Silesian University of Technology
- Profession: Politician, engineer
- Awards: Cross of Freedom and Solidarity; Cross of Merit; Order of the Holy Sepulchre

Ryszard Tur (born 10 August 1944) is Polish local government official, engineer who served as mayor of Białystok in 1998–2006.

== Biography ==
Tur was born on 10 August 1944 in Piliki. He graduated from the Silesian University of Technology in Gliwice. In 1970–1984 he was employed at the Białystok Municipal Construction Design Office. Then, until 1991, he lectured at the Bialystok University of Technology. In 1990–2002, he served three terms on the city council. He was a member of the city board, vice-president, and from 1998, on behalf of Solidarity Electoral Action, mayor of Białystok. On October 4, 2002, the inaugural election convention of Ryszard Tur, the presidential candidate supported by the right wing united in the Białystok Right Alliance bloc (including the Civic Platform, the Catholic Intelligentsia Club, the Movement for the Reconstruction of Poland, the Conservative People's Party, the Christian Social Movement "Dobro Wspólne" and various associations), took place at the Forum cinema. Law and Justice decided to run separately and put forward its own mayoral candidate. During the mayoral campaign Prime Minister Leszek Miller sent him congratulatory letter. Large-format billboards with Ryszard Tur's profile and the slogan "Let Białystok win" appeared in several key locations in Białystok. Ryszard Tur also had well-designed leaflets and television spots. In the race for the mayor of Białystok, only three candidates were considered: Ryszard Tur, Zbigniew Puchalski, and Marek Kozłowski. After winning the direct elections, he took this position for the second time (he ran from the Białystok Right-wing Agreement committee).

In 2006, he did not seek re-election, unsuccessfully running on the Christian Local Government Movement list for the Podlaskie Voivodeship Sejmik. In 2007, he tried again, unsuccessfully, to obtain a councilor's seat on behalf of the Civic Platform. He returned to work at the Białystok University of Technology as a senior lecturer at the Faculty of Management.

He was member of Solidarity. He was one of the leaders of the Christian National Union. An activist of Catholic Action, he became a knight of the Knights of the Order of the Holy Sepulchre in Jerusalem. In 2003, he took over the management (as president of the main board) of the Christian Self-Government Movement. In August 2007, he was appointed as the proxy of the Right Wing of the Republic in Białystok. As the leader of the ChRS, he became involved with the Agreement party, co-founded by this organization in November 2017.

In 2005, for his services in local government activities, he was awarded the Silver Cross of Merit by President Aleksander Kwaśniewski. In 2015, he was awarded the Honorary Badge for Services to Local Government. In 2021, he was awarded the Cross of Freedom and Solidarity.
