= Biała, Podlaskie Voivodeship =

Biała
- Village
- Location within Poland
- Coordinates: 52°47′46″N 23°14′15″E
- Country: Poland
- Voivodeship: Podlaskie
- County: Bielsk
- Gmina: Bielsk Podlaski

Biała [ˈbʲawa] is a village in the administrative district of Gmina Bielsk Podlaski, within Bielsk County, Podlaskie Voivodeship, in north-eastern Poland.
