= Korpacz =

- Settlement
- Location within Poland
- Coordinates: 52°51′52″N 23°14′06″E
- Country: Poland
- Voivodeship: Podlaskie
- County: Bielsk
- Gmina: Bielsk Podlaski

Korpacz [ˈkɔrpat͡ʂ] is a settlement in the administrative district of Gmina Bielsk Podlaski, within Bielsk County, Podlaskie Voivodeship, in north-eastern Poland.
