= Hendzel =

- Settlement
- Location within Poland
- Coordinates: 52°45′56″N 23°02′02″E
- Country: Poland
- Voivodeship: Podlaskie
- County: Bielsk
- Gmina: Bielsk Podlaski

Hendzel [ˈxɛnd͡zɛl] is a settlement in the administrative district of Gmina Bielsk Podlaski, within Bielsk County, Podlaskie Voivodeship, in north-eastern Poland.
