= Pasynki, Bielsk County =

Pasynki
- Village
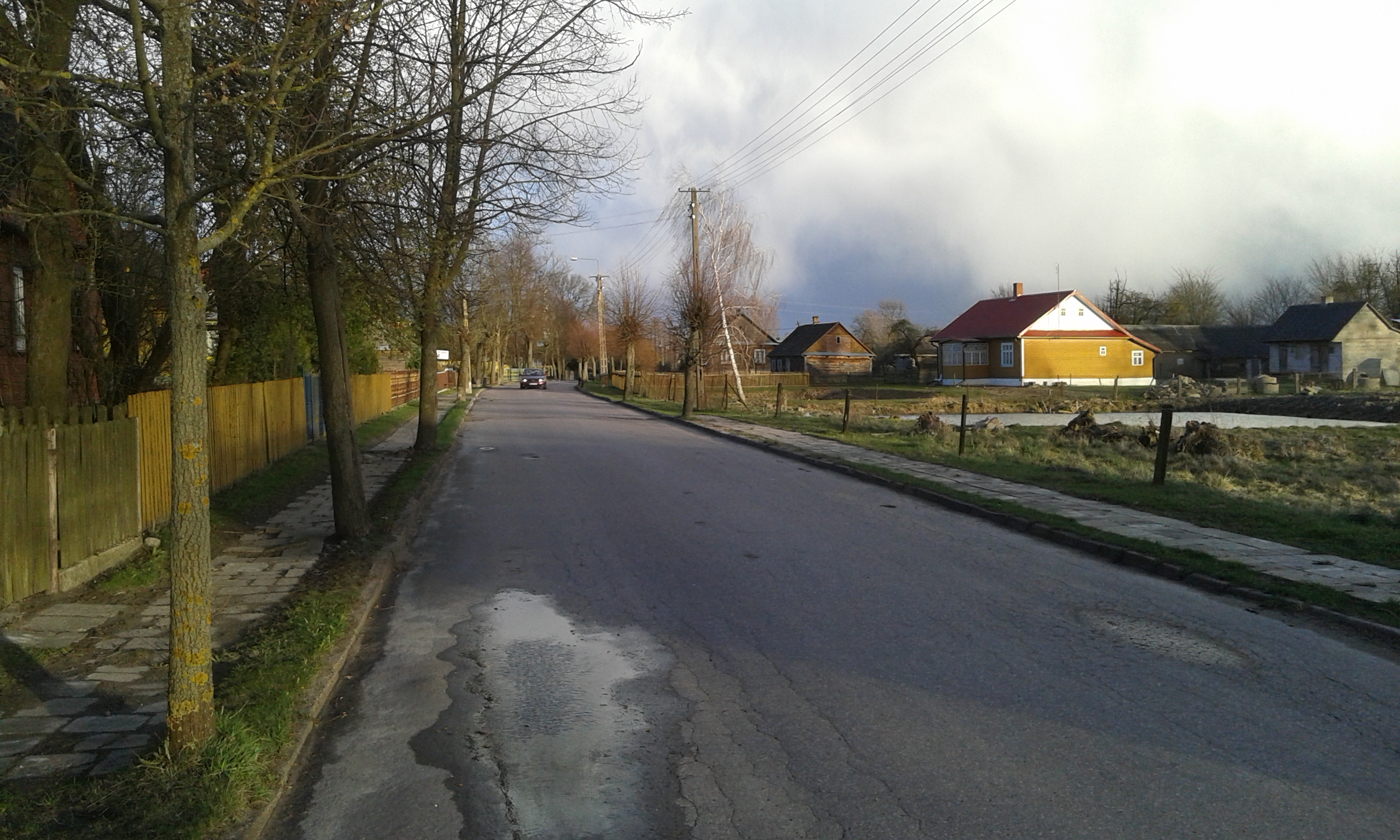

- Location within Poland
- Coordinates: 52°48′N 23°18′E
- Country: Poland
- Voivodeship: Podlaskie
- County: Bielsk
- Gmina: Bielsk Podlaski

Pasynki [paˈsɨŋki] is a village in the administrative district of Gmina Bielsk Podlaski, within Bielsk County, Podlaskie Voivodeship, in north-eastern Poland.
