= Knorydy Górne =

- Village
- Location within Poland
- Coordinates: 52°42′32″N 23°5′41″E
- Country: Poland
- Voivodeship: Podlaskie
- County: Bielsk
- Gmina: Bielsk Podlaski

Knorydy Górne [knɔˈrɨdɨ ˈɡurnɛ] is a village that is located in the administrative district of Gmina Bielsk Podlaski, within Bielsk County, Podlaskie Voivodeship, in north-eastern Poland.
