= Bańki =

- Village
- Location within Poland
- Coordinates: 52°49′N 23°8′E
- Country: Poland
- Voivodeship: Podlaskie
- County: Bielsk
- Gmina: Bielsk Podlaski
- Population: 130

Bańki [ˈbaɲkʲi] is a village in the administrative district of Gmina Bielsk Podlaski, within Bielsk County, Podlaskie Voivodeship. It is in north-eastern Poland.
