= Skrzypki Duże =

- Village
- Location within Poland
- Coordinates: 52°44′N 23°3′E
- Country: Poland
- Voivodeship: Podlaskie
- County: Bielsk
- Gmina: Bielsk Podlaski

Skrzypki Duże [ˈskʂɨpki ˈduʐɛ] is a village in the administrative district of Gmina Bielsk Podlaski, within Bielsk County, Podlaskie Voivodeship, in north-eastern Poland.
