= Krzywa, Bielsk County =

Krzywa
- Village
- Location within Poland
- Coordinates: 52°46′0″N 23°20′40″E
- Country: Poland
- Voivodeship: Podlaskie
- County: Bielsk
- Gmina: Bielsk Podlaski

Krzywa [ˈkʂɨva] is a village in the administrative district of Gmina Bielsk Podlaski, within Bielsk County, Podlaskie Voivodeship, in north-eastern Poland.
