= Lu Bin =

Lu Bin or Lü Bin may refer to:

- Lü Bin (swimmer) (born 1977), female Chinese swimmer
- Lu Bin (sprinter) (born 1987), Chinese sprinter
- Lü Bin (boxer) (born 1994), Chinese boxer

== See also ==
- Lu Bing (born 1944), a Zhuang politician from the People's Republic of China
- Lubin (disambiguation)
