= Łubin Kościelny =

- Village
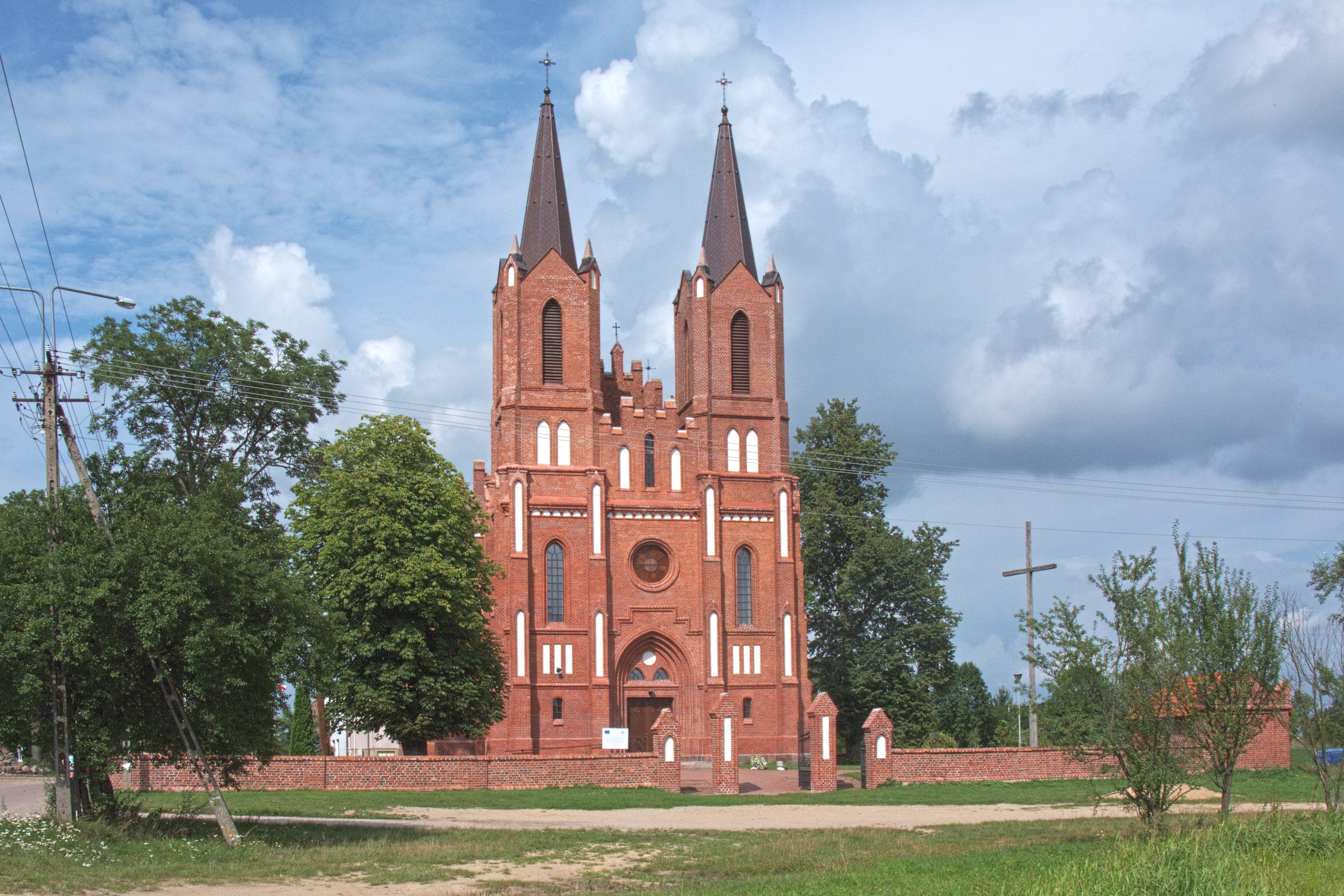

- Location within Poland
- Coordinates: 52°46′N 23°1′E
- Country: Poland
- Voivodeship: Podlaskie
- County: Bielsk
- Gmina: Bielsk Podlaski

Łubin Kościelny [ˈwubin kɔɕˈt͡ɕɛlnɨ] is a village in the administrative district of Gmina Bielsk Podlaski, within Bielsk County, Podlaskie Voivodeship, in north-eastern Poland.
