= Kożyno =

- Village
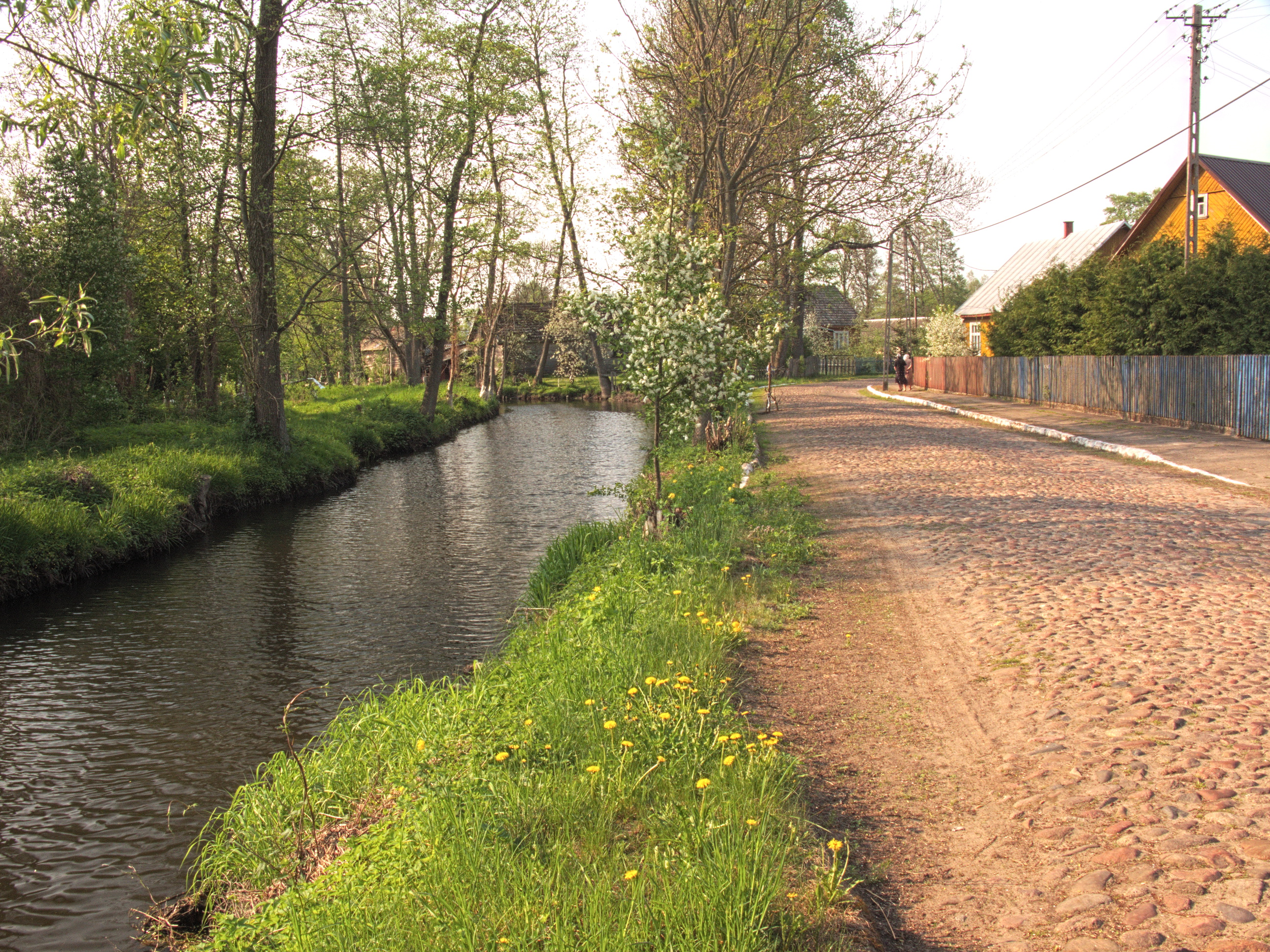

- Location within Poland
- Coordinates: 52°52′52″N 23°18′03″E
- Country: Poland
- Voivodeship: Podlaskie
- County: Bielsk
- Gmina: Bielsk Podlaski
- Time zone: UTC+1 (CET)
  - Summer (DST): UTC+2 (CEST)

Kożyno [kɔˈʐɨnɔ] is a village in the administrative district of Gmina Bielsk Podlaski, within Bielsk County, Podlaskie Voivodeship, in north-eastern Poland.

== History ==
Seven Polish citizens were murdered by Nazi Germany in the village during World War II.
