= Ogrodniki, Bielsk County =

Ogrodniki
- Village
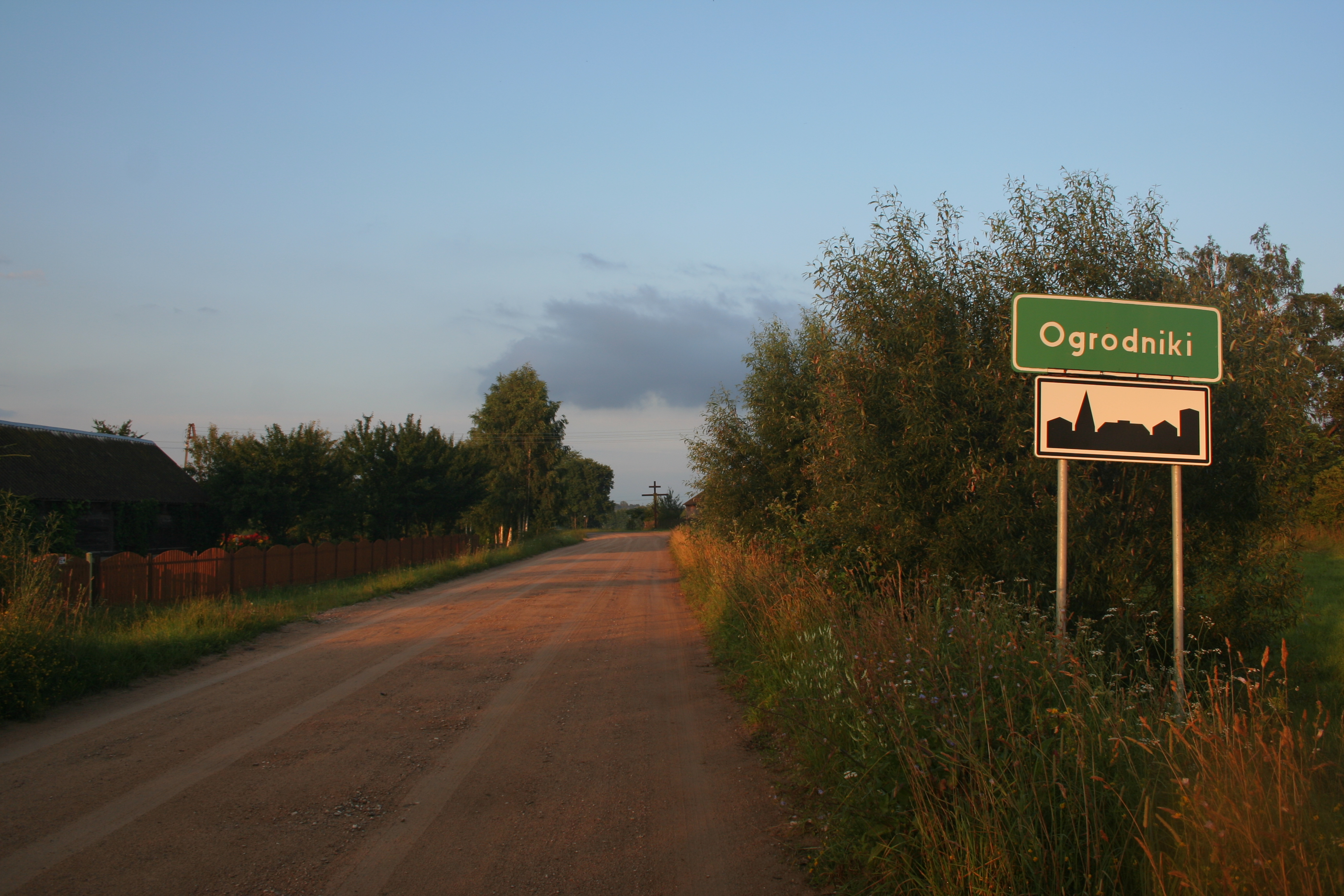
- Road sign in Ogrodniki

- Location within Poland
- Coordinates: 52°46′26″N 23°17′58″E
- Country: Poland
- Voivodeship: Podlaskie
- County: Bielsk
- Gmina: Bielsk Podlaski
- Postal code: 17-100
- Vehicle registration: BBI

Ogrodniki [ɔɡrɔdˈɲikʲi] is a village in the administrative district of Gmina Bielsk Podlaski, within Bielsk County, Podlaskie Voivodeship, in north-eastern Poland.

Two Polish citizens were murdered by Nazi Germany in the village during World War II.
