= Lubin (surname) =

Lubin is a surname. Notable people with the name include:

- Arthur Lubin (1898–1995), American film producer of Abbott and Costello comedies
- Barry Lubin, American circus performer
- Clev Lubin, American football player
- Dan Lubin, American academic
- David Lubin
- Erickson Lubin, American boxer
- Frank Lubin (1910–1999), Lithuanian-American basketball player
- Germaine Lubin, French singer
- Gilson Lubin, Canadian broadcaster and comedian
- Harry Lubin, American composer and arranger
- Jonathan Lubin, mathematician
- Joseph Lubin (accountant), American
- Joseph Lubin (entrepreneur)
- Lior Lubin (born 1979), Israeli basketball player and coach
- Saint Lubin, also known as Leobinus
- Siegmund Lubin (1851–1923), Berman-American motion picture pioneer and founder of Lubin Film Studios
- Simon J. Lubin (1876–1936), American businessman and political activist.
- Steven Lubin, American pianist
- Thierry Lubin, French sprinter
