= Gmina Bielsk Podlaski =

Gmina Bielsk Podlaski Bielsk Podlaski Commune
- Gmina
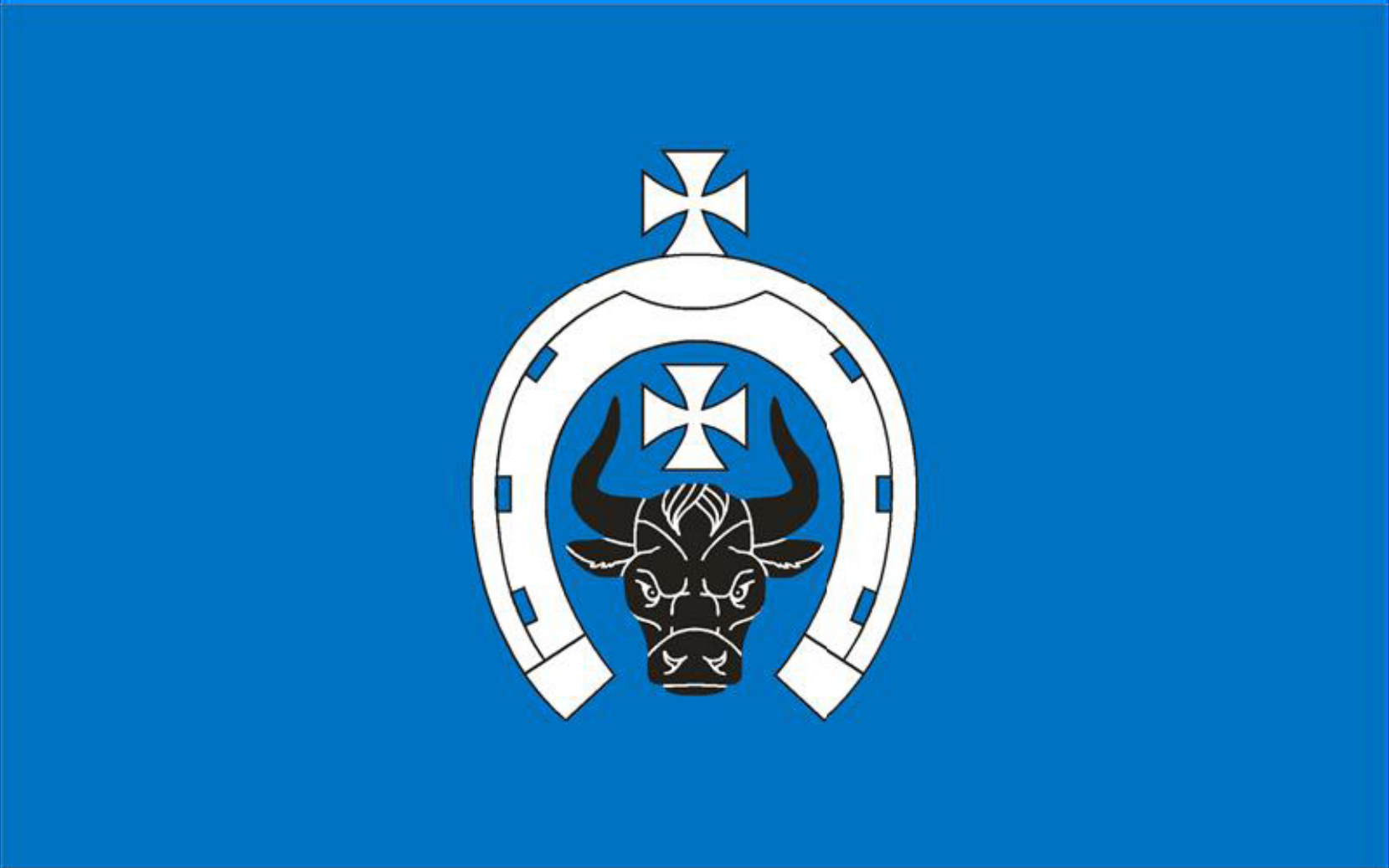
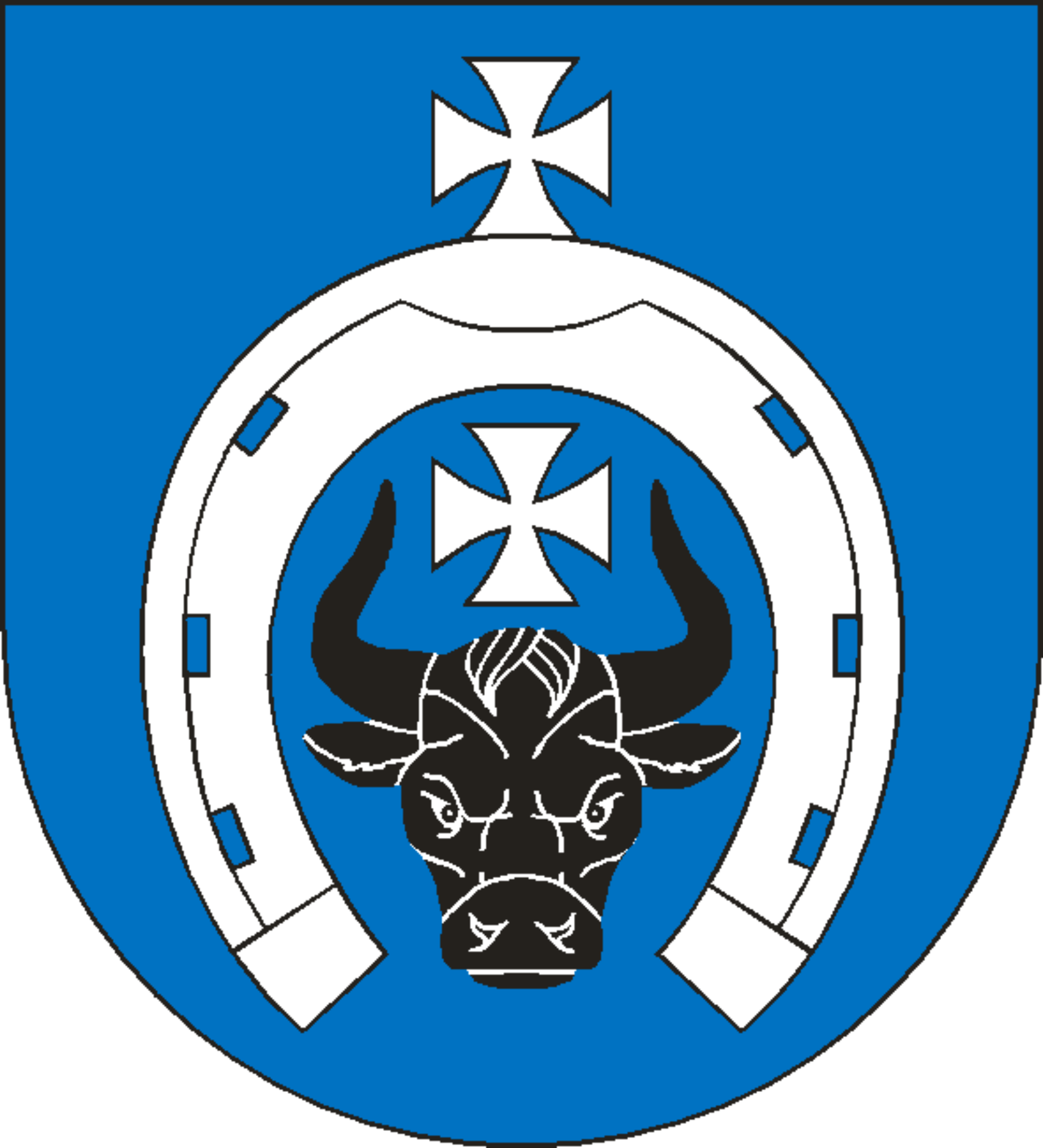
- Flag Coat of arms

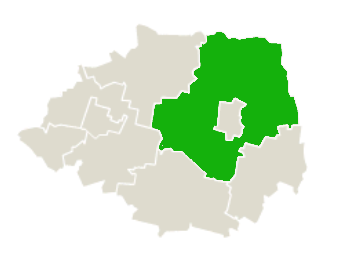
- Location within Bielsk County

- Location within Poland
- Coordinates (Bielsk Podlaski): 52°46′N 23°12′E
- Country: Poland
- Voivodeship: Podlaskie
- County: Bielsk
- Seat: Bielsk Podlaski

Government
  - Mayor: Raisa Rajecka

Area
  - Total: 430.14 km^{2} (166.08 sq mi)

Population (2007)
  - Total: 7,286
  - Density: 16.94/km^{2} (43.87/sq mi)
- Time zone: UTC+1 (CET)
  - Summer (DST): UTC+2 (CEST)
- Postal code: 17-100 to 17-102
- Area code: +48 085
- Car plates: BBI
- Website: http://www.bielskpodlaski.pl

Gmina Bielsk Podlaski [ˈbjɛlsk pɔdˈlaski] is a rural gmina (Polish:gmina wiejska) in Bielsk County, Podlaskie Voivodeship. It is located in north-eastern Poland.

== Geography ==
The gmina covers an area of 430.14 square kilometres (166.1 sq mi)

=== Rivers ===
Five rivers pass through the Gmina:

- The Narew River, a tributary of the Bug River
- The Strabelka River, a tributary of the Narew River
- The Orlanka River, a tributary of the Narew River
- The Biała River, a tributary of the Orlanka River
- The Łoknica River, a tributary of the Narew River

== Demographics ==
As of 2007 its total population is 7,286.

== Municipal Government ==
Its seat is the town of Bielsk Podlaski, although the town is not part of the territory of the gmina.

=== Executive Branch ===
The chief executive of the government is the mayor (Polish: wójt).

=== Legislative Branch ===
The legislative portion of the government is the City Council (Polish: Rada), composed of the President (Polish: Przewodniczący), the vice-president (Polish: Wiceprzewodniczący) and thirteen councilors.

=== Villages ===
Augustowo, Bańki, Biała, Bielanowszczyzna, Bolesty, Brześcianka, Chraboły, Deniski, Dobromil, Dubiażyn, Dwór, Gaj, Grabowiec, Haćki, Hendzel, Hołody, Hryniewicze Duże, Hryniewicze Małe, Husaki, Jacewicze, Knorozy, Knorydy, Knorydy Górne, Knorydy Podleśne, Knorydy Średnie, Korpacz, Koszarka, Kotły, Kozły, Kożyno Duże, Kożyno Małe, Krzywa, Lewki, Łoknica, Łubin Kościelny, Łubin Rudołty, Malinowo, Miękisze, Mokre, Na Brańskiej, Nałogi, Ogrodniki, Orlanka, Orzechowicze, Parcewo, Pasynki, Pietrzykowo-Gołąbki, Pietrzykowo-Wyszki, Piliki, Pilipki, Ploski, Plutycze, Podbiele, Proniewicze, Rajki, Rajsk, Rzepniewo, Saki, Sierakowizna, Skrzypki Duże, Skrzypki Małe, Sobotczyzna, Sobótka, Stołowacz, Stryki, Stupniki, Szastały, Szewele, Treszczotki, Truski, Użyki, Widowo, Woronie, Zawady, Zubowo.

=== Neighbouring Municipalities ===
Gmina Bielsk Podlaski is bordered by the town of Bielsk Podlaski and by the gminas of Boćki, Brańsk, Czyże, Juchnowiec Kościelny, Narew, Orla, Wyszki and Zabłudów.
