= Bielsk County =

Bielsk County powiat bielski
- County
- Flag Coat of arms

- Bielsk County in Podlaskie Voivodeship

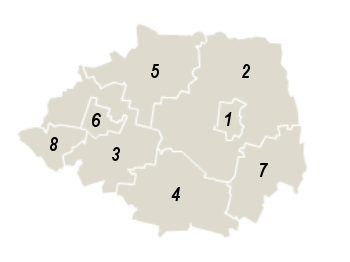
- Gminy in Bielsk County
- Coordinates (Bielsk Podlaski): 52°46′N 23°12′E
- Country: Poland
- Voivodeship: Podlaskie
- Seat: Bielsk Podlaski
- Gminas: Total 8: Bielsk Podlaski; Brańsk; Gmina Bielsk Podlaski; Gmina Boćki; Gmina Brańsk; Gmina Orla; Gmina Rudka; Gmina Wyszki

Government
  - County Executive: Slawomir Jerzy Snarski

Area
  - Total: 1,385.2 km^{2} (534.8 sq mi)

Population (2019)
  - Total: 54,590
  - Density: 39.41/km^{2} (102.1/sq mi)
  - Urban: 29,057
  - Rural: 25,533
- Time zone: UTC+1 (CET)
  - Summer (DST): UTC+2 (CEST)
- Car plates: BBI
- Website: www.powiatbielski.pl

Bielsk County (Polish: powiat bielski) is a unit of territorial administration and local government (powiat) in Podlaskie Voivodeship, north-eastern Poland. It came into being on 1 January 1999, as a result of the Polish local government reforms passed in 1998. Its administrative seat and largest town is Bielsk Podlaski, which lies 39 kilometres (24 mi) south of the regional capital Białystok. The only other town in the county is Brańsk, lying 25 km (16 mi) west of Bielsk Podlaski.

The county covers an area of 1,385.2 square kilometres (534.8 sq mi). As of 2019 its total population is 54,590, out of which the population of Bielsk Podlaski is 25,290, that of Brańsk is 3,767, and the rural population is 25,533.

== Neighbouring counties ==
Bielsk County is bordered by Białystok County to the north, Hajnówka County to the east, Siemiatycze County to the south and Wysokie Mazowieckie County to the west.

== Administrative divisions ==
The county is subdivided into eight gminas (two urban and six rural). These are listed in the following table, in descending order of population.

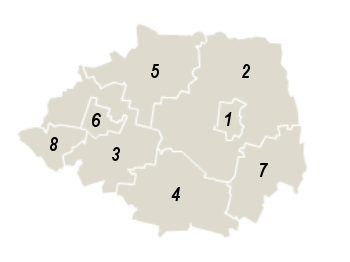
Gimny in Bielsk County

Number	Gmina	Type	Area (km^{2})	Population (2019)	Seat
1	Bielsk Podlaski	urban	26.9	25,290	
2	Gmina Bielsk Podlaski	rural	430.1	6,636	Bielsk Podlaski *
3	Gmina Brańsk	rural	227.3	5,672	Brańsk *
4	Gmina Boćki	rural	232.1	4,263	Boćki
5	Gmina Wyszki	rural	206.5	4,378	Wyszki
6	Brańsk	urban	32.4	3,767	
7	Gmina Orla	rural	159.7	2,708	Orla
8	Gmina Rudka	rural	70.2	1,876	Rudka
* seat not part of the gmina

== History ==
=== 15th century ===
On 18 January 1493, Brańsk received a city charter based on Magdeburg rights from the Grand Duke of Lithuania, Alexander Jagiellon. It was the first city in Podlaskie to receive such a charter.

On 18 November 1495, Bielsk Podlaski received a city charter based on Magdeburg rights from the Grand Duke of Lithuania, Alexander Jagiellon.

=== 16th century ===
On 1 July 1569, the Union of Lublin was signed between the Grand Duchy of Lithuania and the Kingdom of Poland forming the Polish–Lithuanian Commonwealth. One of the terms of the treaty transferred the Podlaskie Voivodeship from the Grand Duchy of Lithuania to the Polish Crown.

=== 18th century ===
On 24 October 1795, the Third Partition of Poland assigned Bielsk County and most of Podlaskie to Prussia

=== 19th century ===
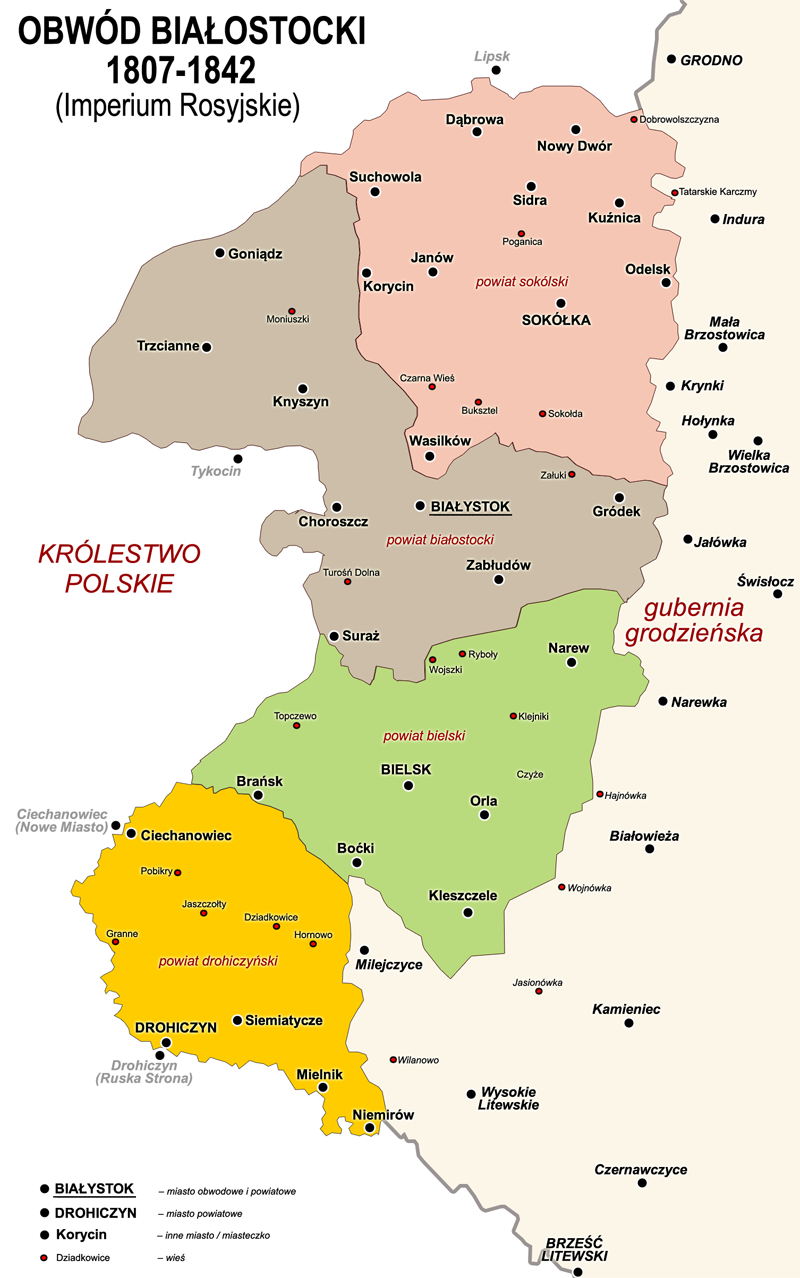
Administrative division 1807–42

On 7–9 July 1807, the Treaties of Tilsit were signed between Imperial Russia, the First French Empire and Prussia. The treaties repartitioned former Polish territory and assigned Bielsk County and most of eastern Podlaskie from Prussia to Imperial Russia.

It was, from 1796 to 1915, subdivided into 8 Volost.

- włość oleksińska – Oleksin
- włość dubiażyńska – Dubiażyn
- włość klejnicka – Klejniki
- włość łosińska – Łosinka
- włość maleszewska – Malesze
- włość nowoberezowska – Nowe Berezowo
- włość orleńska – Orla
- włość pasynkowska – Pasynki

=== 20th century ===
On 15 August 1915, the Gorlice-Tarnów Offensive by the German forces on the Eastern Front of World War I caused Bielsk County to come under the control of the German Empire.

On 5 November 1916, a declaration by the German Empire and the Austro-Hungarian Empire, promised the creation of the Kingdom of Poland in the areas of Poland controlled by the German Empire, including Bielsk County.

On 3 March 1918, the Treaty of Brest-Litovsk was signed between the Russian SFSR and the Central Powers. Bielsk County was assigned to the Kingdom of Poland

On 28 June 1919, the Treaty of Versailles and the Little Treaty of Versailles were signed establishing the Second Polish Republic. Bielsk County was assigned to Poland.

From 15 September 1939 to 23 September 1939 Bielsk County was occupied by German troops

From 23 September 1939 to 22 June 1941 occupation by the Red Army.

Following the start of Operation Barbarossa, 22 June 1941 to 30 July 1944, Bielsk County was occupied by the German Army.

On 30 July 1944 Bielsk County was re-occupied by the Red Army.

On 5 February 1946, the Border Agreement between Poland and the USSR of 16 August 1945 was ratified by Poland and the USSR. The agreement assigned Bielsk County to Poland.
