= Decoration of wooden houses in Podlachia =

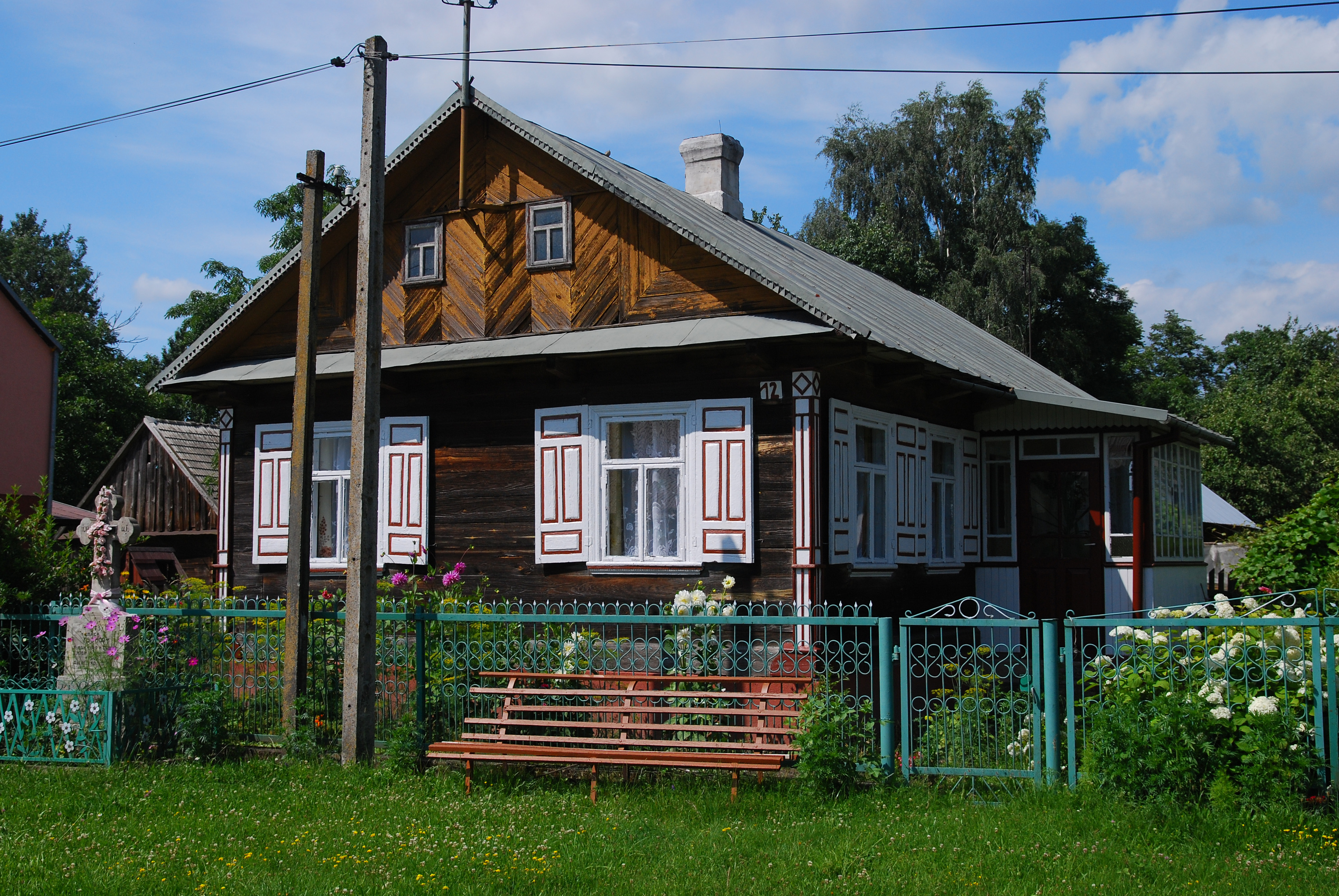
Kotówka, house no. 12

Decoration of wooden houses in Podlachia is a style in folk architecture, 20th century in Podlachia region, characteristic only for this region, the oldest preserved examples of which come from the beginning of the 20th century. Ornaments and decorations were cut out on boards, which were then painted in a contrasting color to the walls and nailed to doors, windows, gables, porches, corners and eaves. The Podlachia style of ornamentation of wooden houses began to disappear after World War II due to the spread of brick construction and the migration of people from the countryside to cities, and its end came in the 1970s. Due to the typical style of the windows and their decorations, the region became known as the Land of Open Shutters (Polish: Kraina Otwartych Okiennic).

== Overview ==
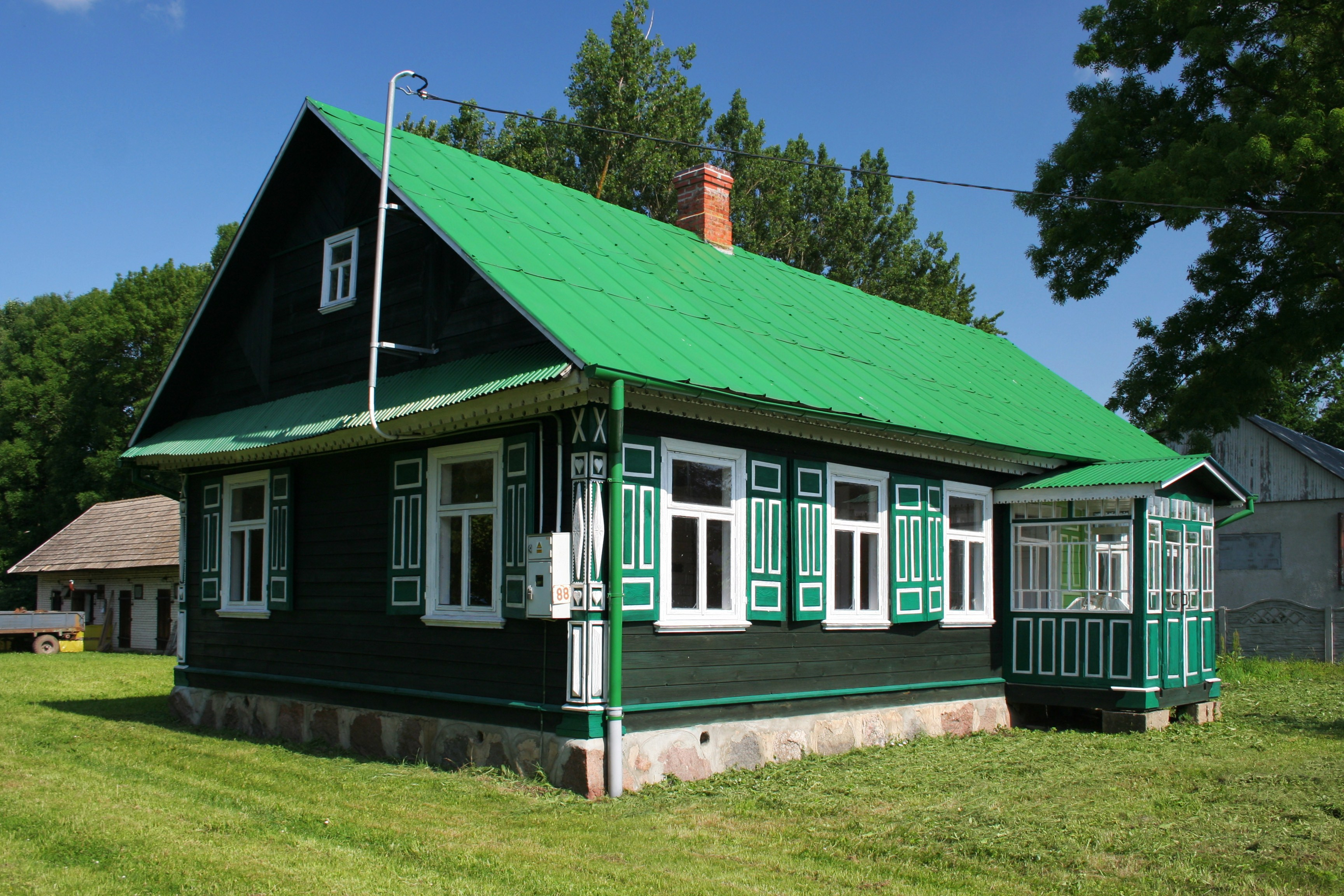
Nowoberezowo, house no. 88

In the Podlachia region, especially in the Bielsk and Hajnówka counties, wooden residential houses are often architecturally decorated in their own style. At the beginning of the 20th century, village buildings were still built according to the spatial layout of the Volok Reform that had been established since the 16th century. This tradition also included the layout of rooms and the shapes of buildings. The oldest preserved, decorated wooden houses in Podlachia date back to the beginning of the 20th century. The oldest ornaments preserved to this day date back to the years 1920–1940 and sometimes to the period up to the 1960s.

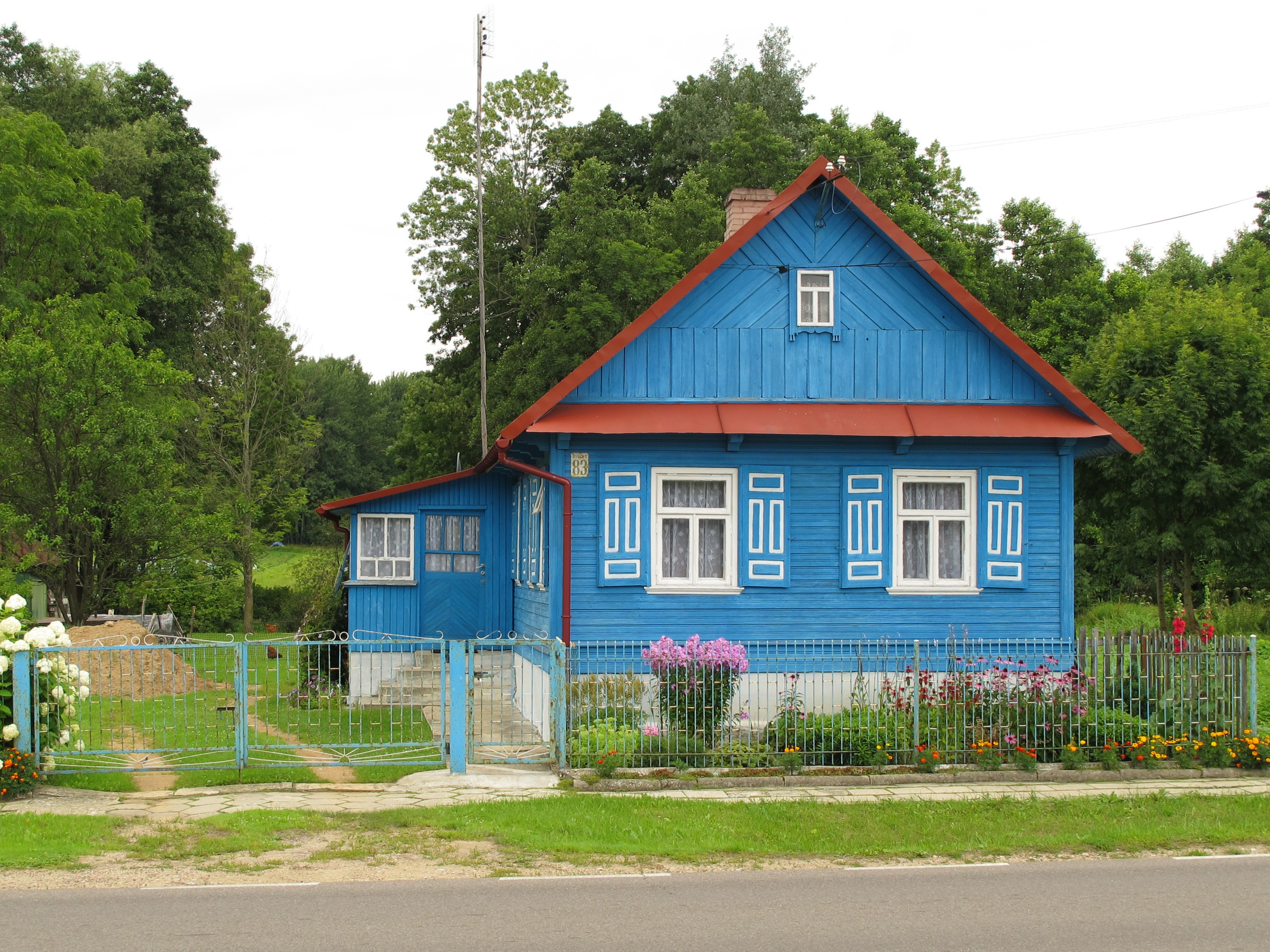
Ryboły, house no. 83

Decorative details were obtained by cutting appropriate patterns in boards, which were then nailed to the corners of houses, above windows, or along the edges of roofs. Particular attention was paid to decorating the front gables of houses. The added ornaments were painted in colours contrasting with the walls of the building. All the decorative details together created a harmonious composition, giving Podlachia architecture a unique style, easily recognizable against the background of other regions of the country.

For cutting out ornaments, frame saws with a narrow blade and English drills with a sharp working part were used (these tools appeared in the second half of the 19th century). When cutting out ornaments, a previously prepared template was used, based on which the contours of the cut detail were drawn with a pencil. The use of templates introduced the repetition of certain decorative motifs characteristic of a given creator.

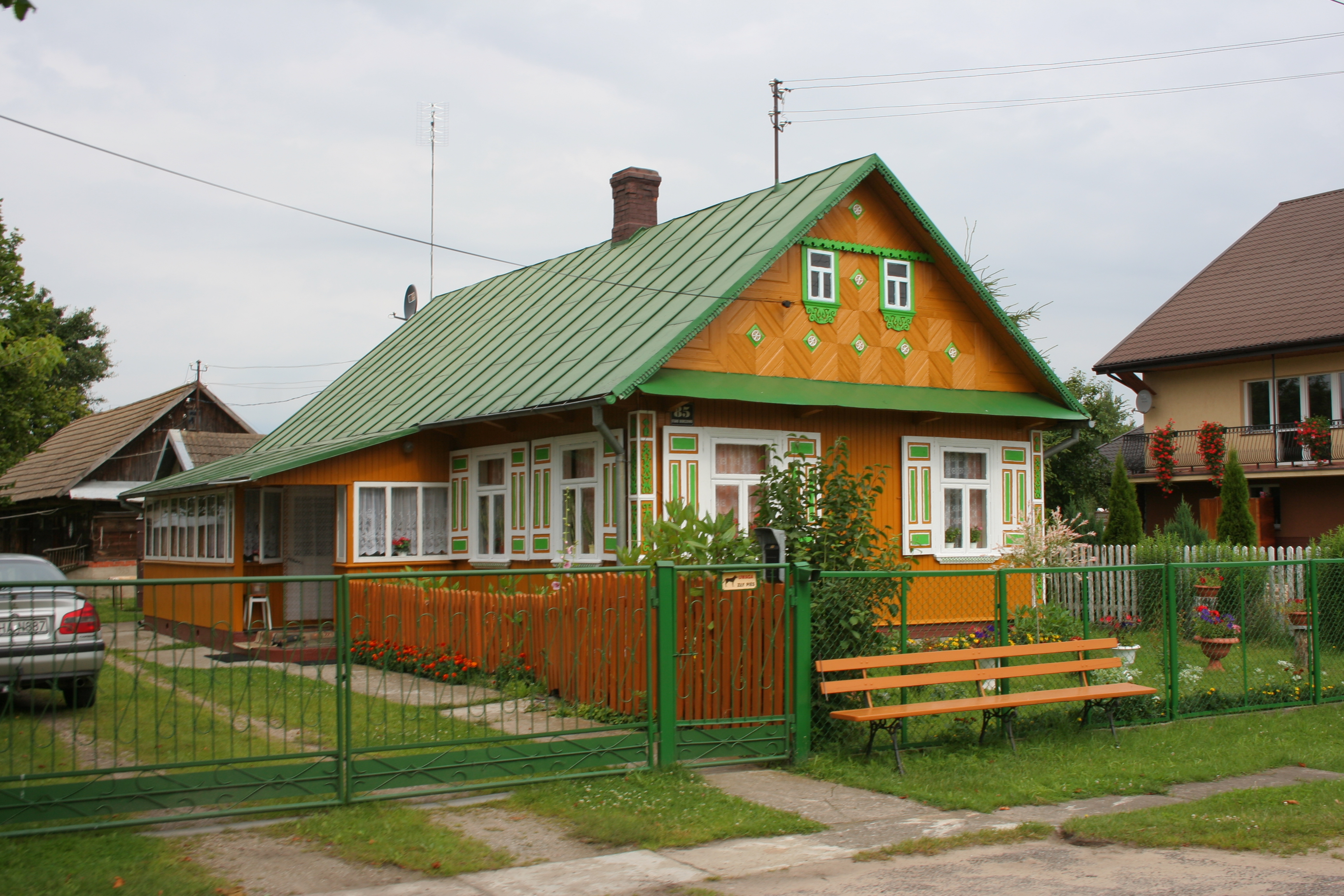
Stare Berezowo, house no. 85

In the Bielsk and Hajnówka counties, geometric and plant ornamentation dominates, zoomorphic motifs were used less often. Among the zoomorphic motifs, a characteristic feature is the symmetrical arrangement of two birds in the window frames. This style of architectural ornamentation dominated until the 1960s. Houses built in the later period were decorated less and less often, and during the renovation of old houses, some of the ornaments were removed. In the 1990s, there were few houses of this type – mainly in villages located near the border with Belarus, due to the ban on renovations there. Despite their disappearance, there are still villages where most of the buildings are decorated. One of these villages is Czyże. The continuation of the tradition by the local population influenced the development of tourism in the region.

== Theories on the source of inspiration ==
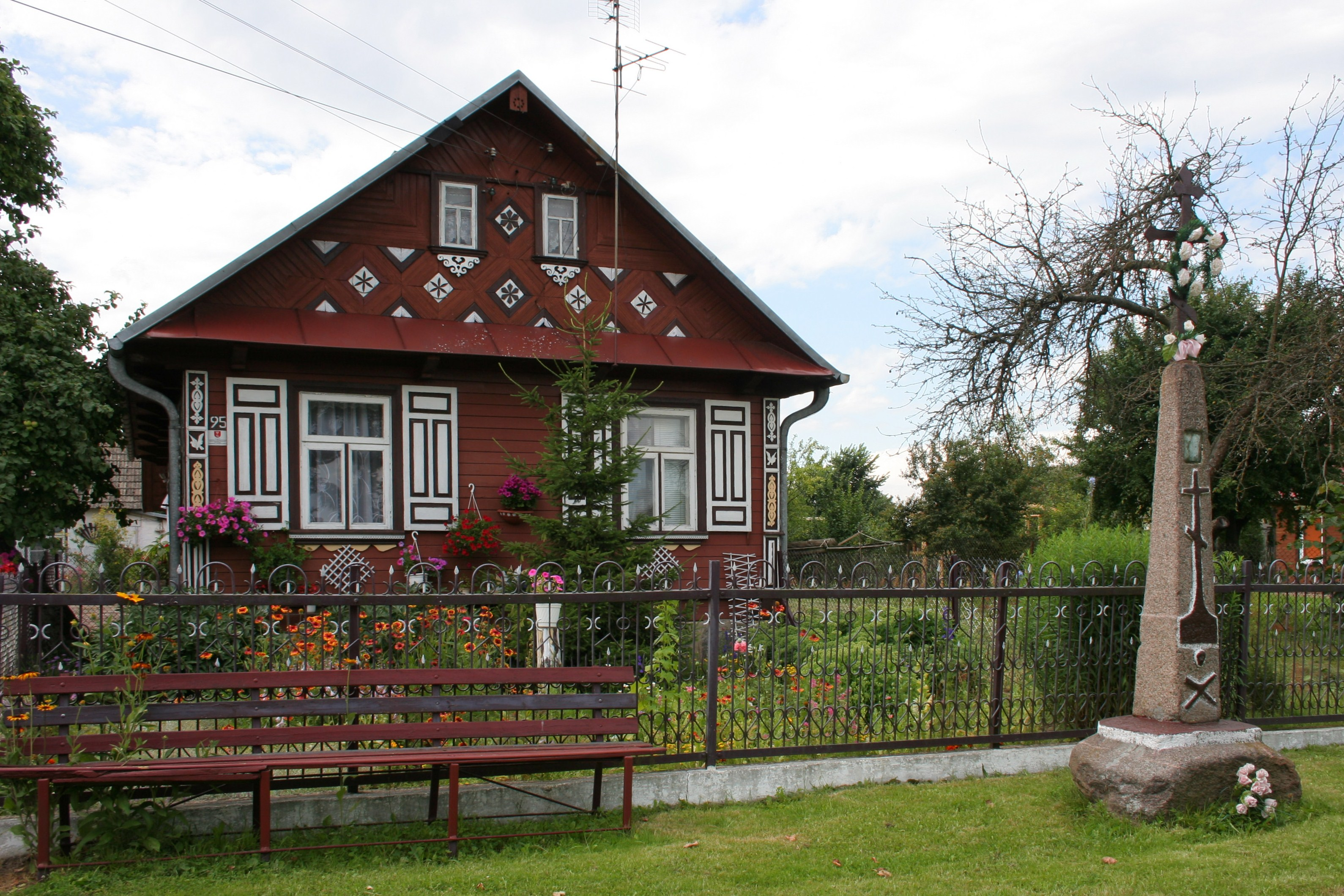
Czyże, house no. 95

Witold Dynowski traced the origins of ornamentation to railway buildings erected by Russian craftsmen, called burlaks by the local population, in the second half of the 19th century. Ornamental window frames, especially window heads, come from burlaks.

The Tsar's Palace in Białowieża became an object that could serve as a model, and its ornamental motifs could be used as inspiration. A similar role was played by Orthodox churches, which, although not richly decorated on the outside, were repeated in the decorations of residential buildings. An example is the Church of St. Anne and the Church of St. Archangel Michael in Stary Kornin, where a strip with a serrated motif was used. This type of ornamentation also occurs in nearby residential buildings. The interior design of Orthodox churches also served as a source of inspiration. According to the oldest makers of architectural decorations, many motifs were taken from religious publications that included decorative elements.

Another source of inspiration was supposed to be the Bieżeństwo (1915–1922), during which many residents of Podlachia villages went deep into Russia, usually to governorates located on both sides of the Ural Mountains. There, they became familiar with the rich architectural decoration of Russian villages and towns. This influenced the development of the decoration of residential buildings in the Białystok region in the interwar period. The "biezhentsy" returned to destroyed houses that had to be rebuilt and during their reconstruction decorative elements were introduced. "Bieżeństwo" was also a turning point in the consciousness of the inhabitants of the region. The xenophobic conservatism, previously criticized by the residents of Podlachia villages, was rejected, and new architectural solutions were accepted. The first machines appeared after returning from the Bieżeństwo.

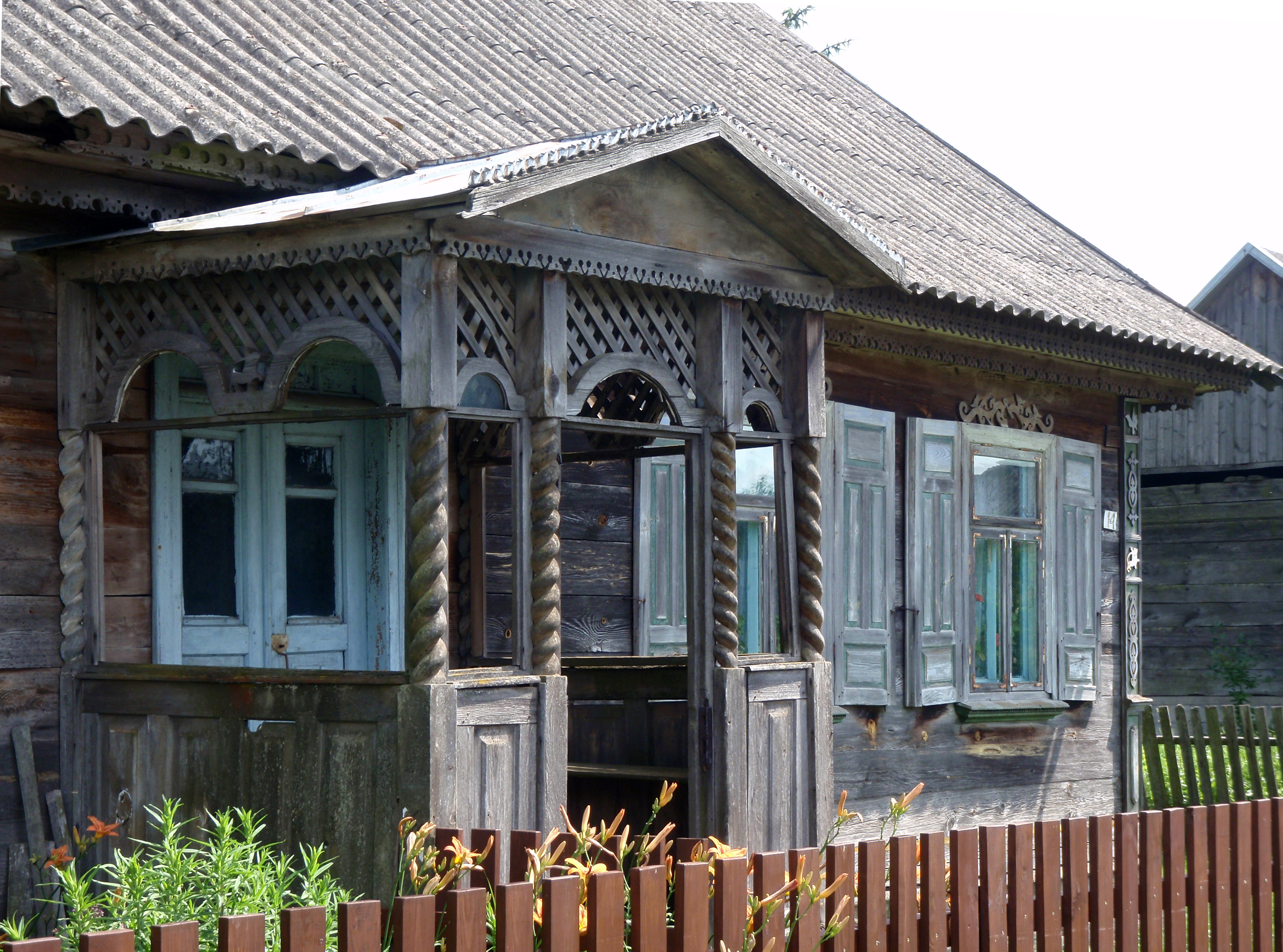
Trywieża, house no. 14, porch with spirally turned posts

These architectural decoration patterns were used by local craftsmen. The ornamentation acquired individual features characteristic only for this area. Local craftsmen sometimes introduced their own ideas. Fyodor Siegien from Rzepiska was a carpenter and built houses. During World War I, he served in the Russian army and was taken prisoner by the Germans. In captivity, he learned the art of watchmaking. After returning home in 1921, he made a clock for himself and hung it on the gable of his house. He also began making similar ones for other people. In 1963, the Belarusian weekly "Niva" encouraged its readers to use Fyodor Siegien's services and order clocks for their homes from him.

== Architectural decorative elements ==
One of the oldest, preserved, decorated parts of the house were the corners, to which vertically arranged boards were nailed. Initially, the corner decoration consisted of profiling the edges of the boards in the shape of a wavy line or serrations. At least since the beginning of the 20th century, the corners were richly decorated. The decorations were made up of geometric and plant motifs. Both corner boards had identical decorative motifs, arranged symmetrically. The corner boards were divided into several, usually four decorative fields, separated from each other by strips. One decorative element was placed in each field.

The oldest, preserved windows have window strips with a serrated cutout. At the turn of the 19th and 20th centuries, shutters became popular. The arrangement of panels, i.e. boards thinner than the frame, is of crucial importance in the appearance of shutters. Two of them were arranged horizontally, and two vertically. Vertical panels were longer. The main decorative element of windows were the window sills and sills. The oldest ones had the form of serrated or circular holes, the younger ones have preserved plant and zoomorphic motifs.

In the 19th century, external doors were made of three or four wide boards arranged vertically. The only decorative element were metal inserts for latch locks. The inserts were shaped like a leaf or a bird's head. In the 19th century, a layer of boards arranged in a rhombus shape was still nailed to the boards forming the structural base of the door. At the beginning of the 20th century, doors with panels began to be installed, and in wealthier houses double-leaf doors. The panels were painted in a color contrasting with the remaining, white surface of the door.

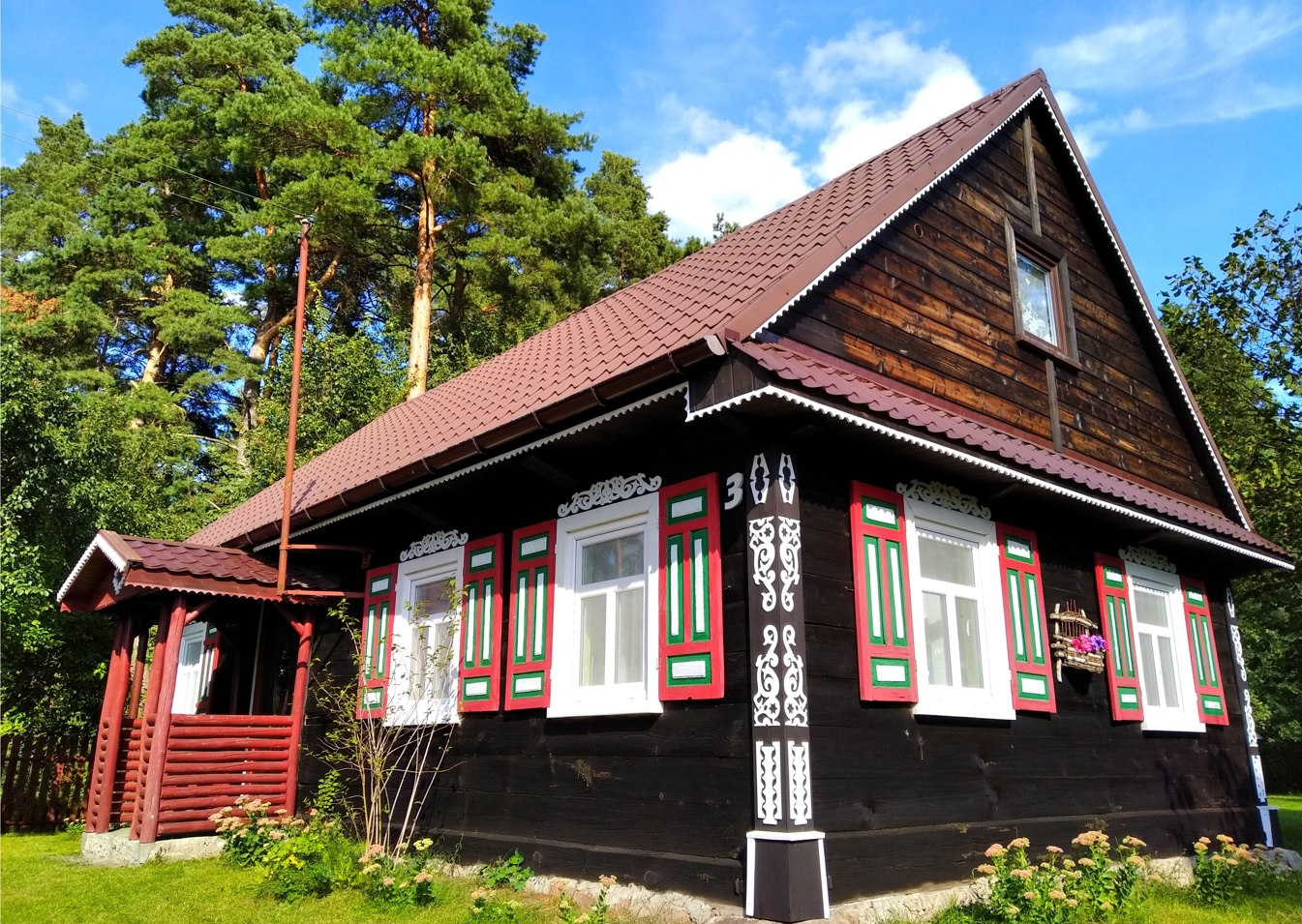
Golakowa Szyja, house no. 3

The most decorative parts of the house were porches. At first, they had simple posts, usually boarded up to half their height, which supported a gable roof. As ornamentation developed, the number of decorative elements of the porch increased. In the next stage, porches began to be built with glazed walls. Glazed porches were called verandas. To enhance the effect, glass panes of different colors were sometimes used. A porch usually contained from 100 to 160 panes. The most architecturally complex porches even exceeded 300 panes and had a similar number of wooden components. Both verandas and open porches decorated the house. Verandas rarely served any practical purpose, more often they served as a representative space, containing decorated furniture, flower pots, bouquets of blessed herbs, toys and various elements that were considered fashionable in a given village at a given time (e.g. samovars imported from the eastern border). An important element of the furnishings were curtains, which provided partial shade in the interior, protected against flies, and also played a decorative role. Glazed verandas appeared in the 1930s. They became popular in the early post-war years, primarily in larger villages located along wide roads (Ryboły, Dubiny, Klejniki).

Verandas and porches are not as characteristic of eastern Podlachia as the decorations of gables, windows and corners. Some houses in towns, and sometimes also in villages, have two porches or two verandas.

== Ornamental motifs ==
Ornamental motifs can be divided into four groups: geometric, plant, zoomorphic and anthropomorphic. The most common are geometric motifs and plant motifs are almost as common. Zoomorphic motifs were used much less frequently, and anthropomorphic motifs were used least often. Geometric motifs were rectangles, squares, triangles, round holes and other geometric figures, such as symbols borrowed from a deck of cards. Plant motifs are leaves and winding stems, zoomorphic motifs are birds (pigeons, roosters, eagles) and animals (squirrels, hares, horses). In the village of Zbucz there is a house on the top of which two fishermen are depicted, while in the window frames – hunters. A very rare motif are the initials of the maker of the decorations or the owner of the house (in the corners).

== The End of Ornamentation ==
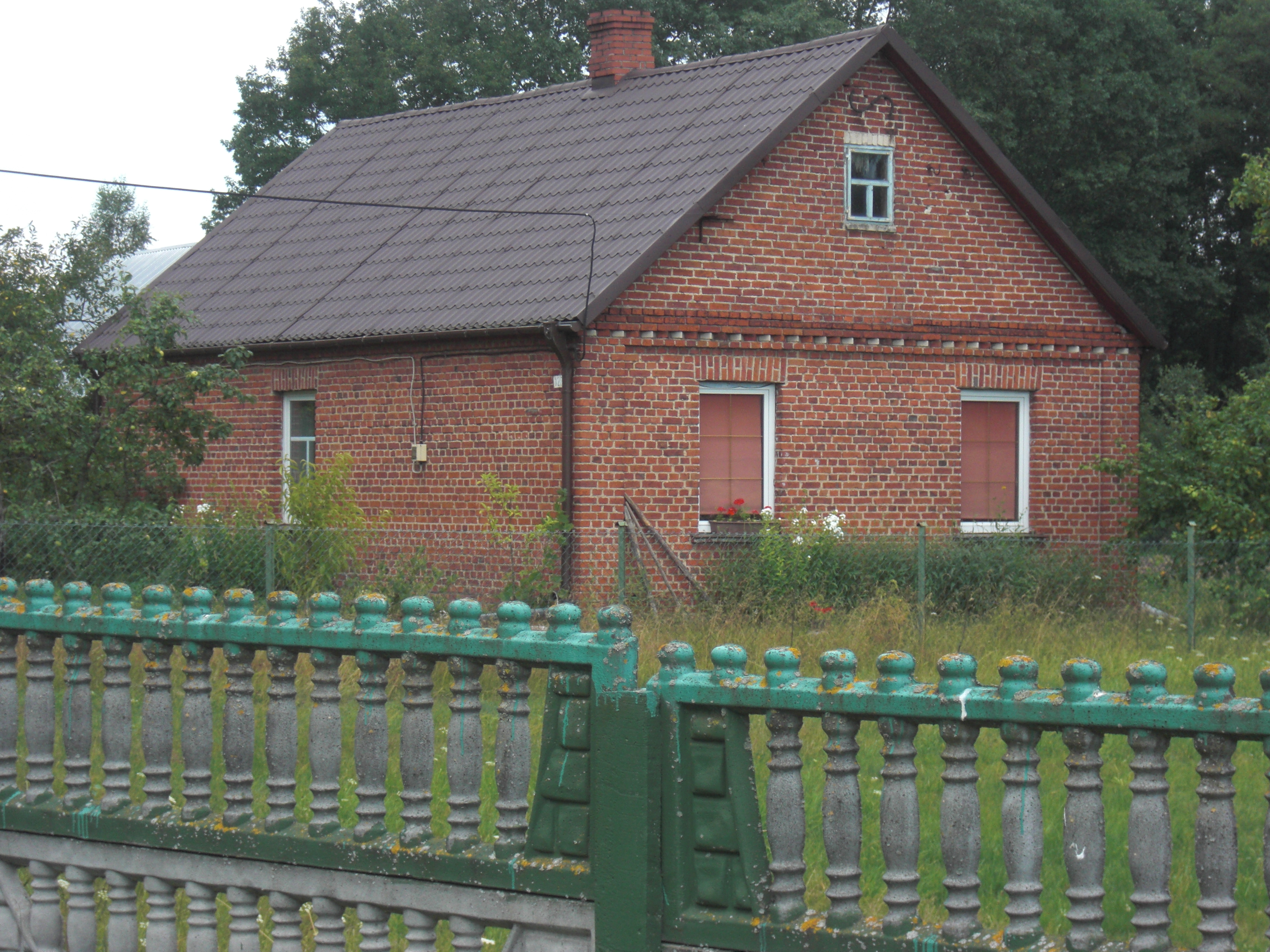
Grabowiec, an example of a "brick wall" variant

After World War II, new building materials were introduced on a larger scale, which began to replace wood. Masonry buildings appeared, breaking away from the previous regional tradition. Also, renovations of old wooden houses were not conducive to preserving ornaments, which were often removed on this occasion. Migration from the countryside to cities, which has been ongoing since the 20th century, was not conducive to maintaining tradition.

== Cultural heritage and opinions about it ==
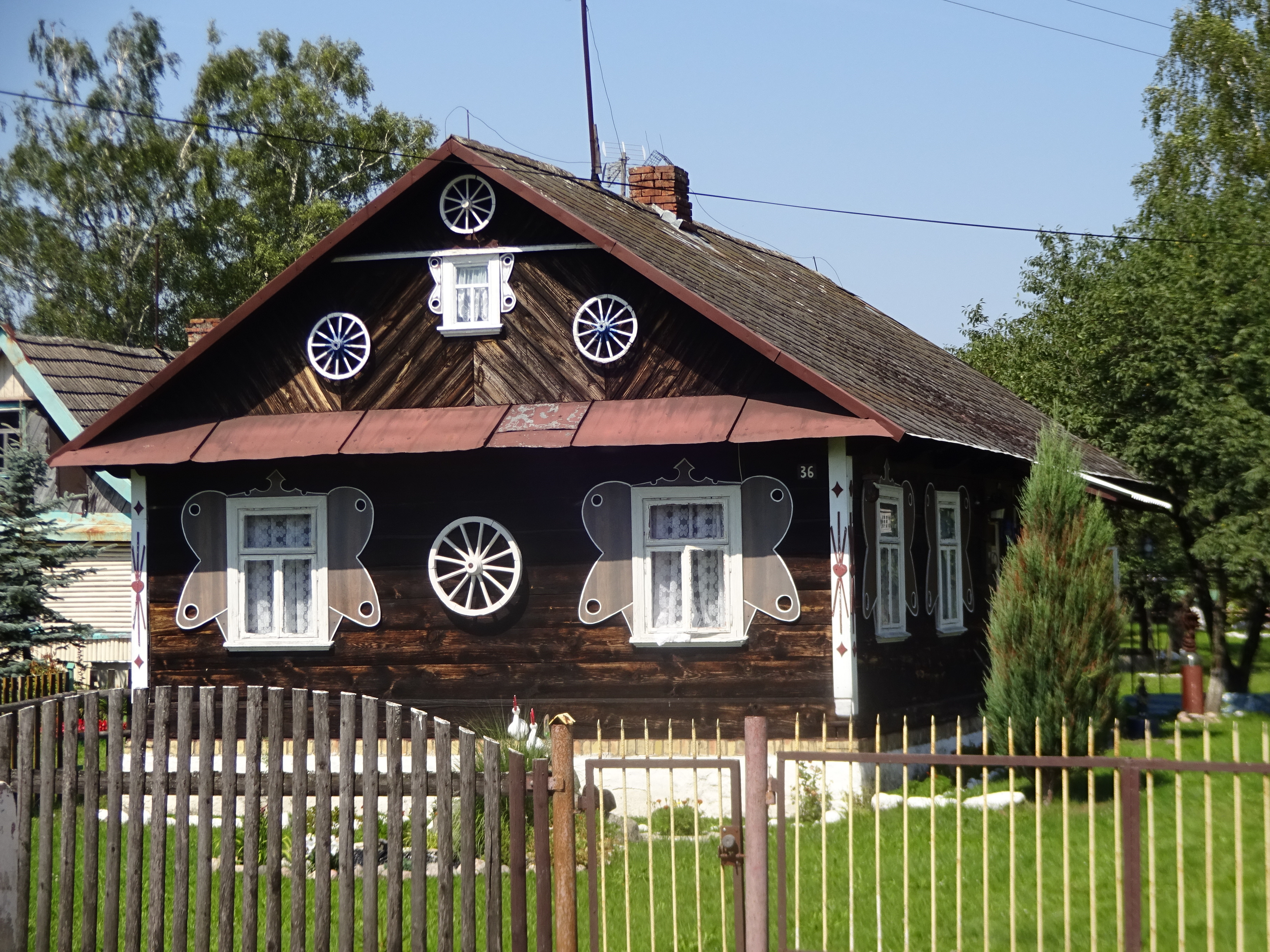
Trześcianka, house no. 36

The fashion for decorating cottages ceased in the 1960s. In the meantime, decorated cottages became so embedded in the landscape of villages located around the Białowieża Forest that they began to be perceived as an inseparable element of the architectural landscape. Despite this, until the end of the 20th century, architectural ornamentation of wooden buildings in the Białystok region was not a subject of particular interest. It was only then that it was noticed that it was an element of local tradition, necessary for preservation and conservation.

Heritage assessments are inconsistent and are not always based on knowledge about the culture of Podlachia. The images of culture in the larger cities of the eastern and southern Białystok region were created by Jews, while in the countryside by Ruthenians, in Bohoniki, Kruszyniany and Drahle by Tatars and in Proniewicze and Kotły by Gypsies. As a result, the local culture in Podlachia is heterogeneous, of diverse origins, interrupted continuity, influenced by armed conflicts and natural disasters. These elements complicate the assessment of heritage. Jarosław Szewczyk noticed that even 19th-century authors – such as Władysław Matlakowski – were concerned about the phenomenon of absorbing foreign patterns affecting local culture and the disappearance of "monuments of bygone times". Analyses of cultural revitalization often have the character of only hypothetical considerations.

Artur Gaweł, an employee of the Podlaskie Museum of Folk Culture (a branch of the Podlasie Museum in Białystok) and Jarosław Szewczyk from the Faculty of Architecture of the Białystok University of Technology, are researching folk architecture in Podlachia. In 2007, Artur Gaweł's richly illustrated work was published.

== See also ==
- Peasants' houses in Podlachia
- Izba
- Mazanka
