= Peasants' houses in Podlachia =

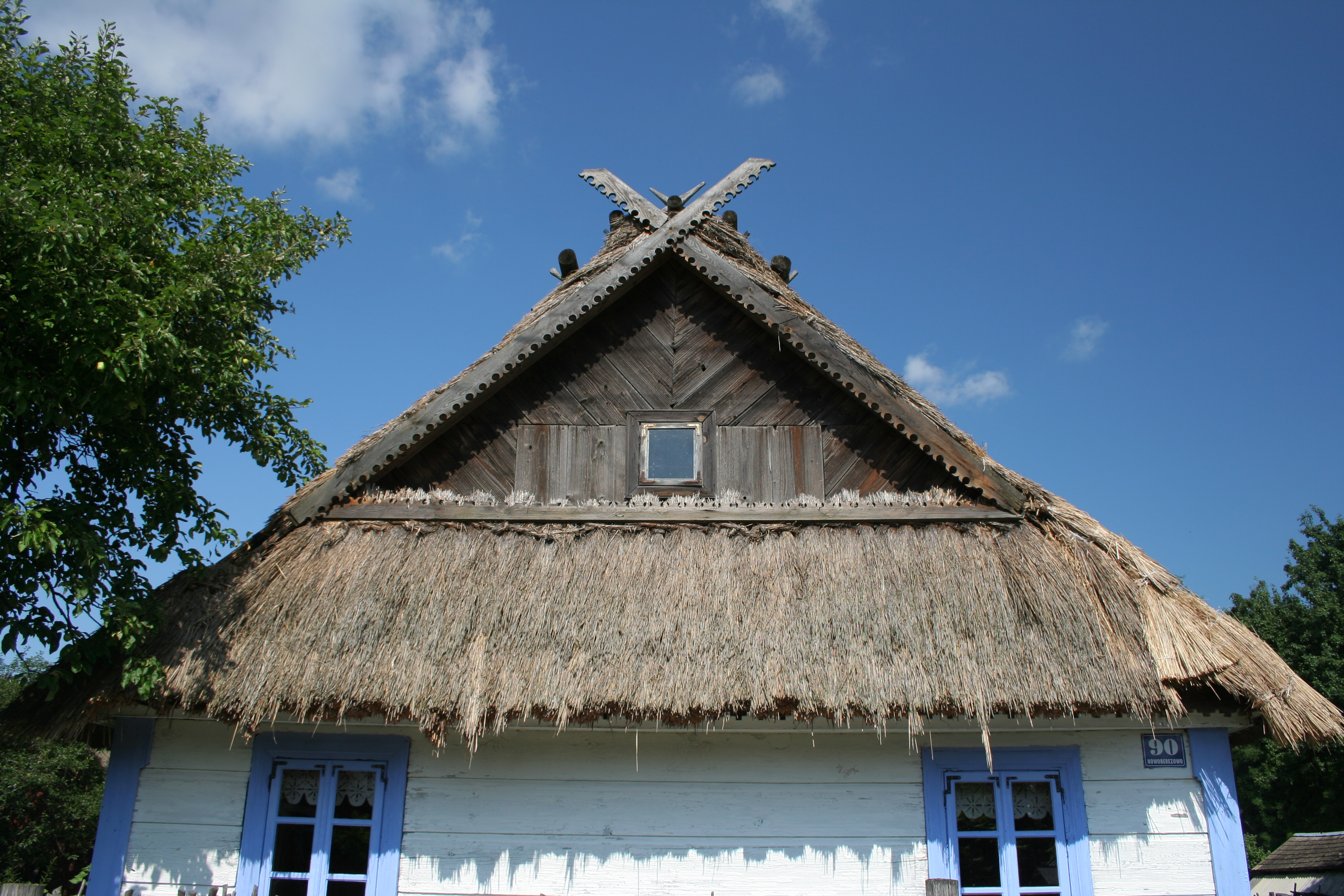
House no. 90 in Nowoberezowo

Peasants' houses in Podlachia, a historical-geographical region in eastern Poland, mostly encompassed today in Podlaskie Voivodeship, were influenced in their style by the cultures of Poland, Lithuania, Belarus and Russia. The location on the Borderlands, together with the specifics of the geography led to the development of a regional variation of Polish architecture.

== History ==
In the 16th and 17th centuries, two basic types of residential buildings developed in the Podlachia region. In the south and west of the Podlachia region, the dominant type was the one with a layout of rooms arranged around a centrally located stove with a chamber chimney. The residential building was separate from the other buildings on the farmstead. The second type, prevalent in the east and north, had a single- or one-and-a-half-bay layout of rooms, and the residential and utility parts were under a common roof. In the 16th century, as a result of the introduction of the Volok Reform, villages with a terrace layout appeared, in which all the farmsteads had the same layout, and the cottages were facing the street with their gables.

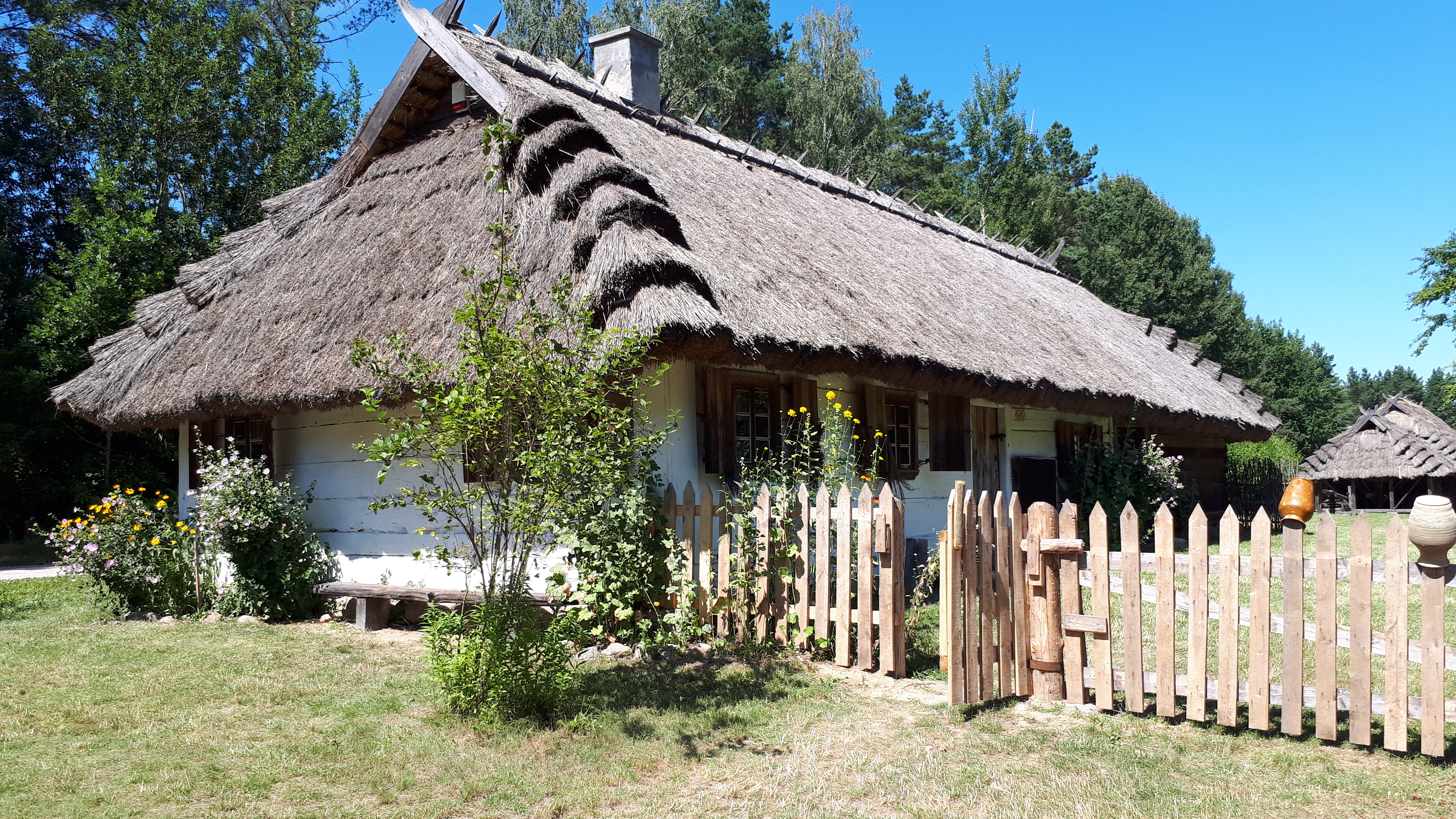
House at the Podlaskie Museum of Folk Culture

The appearance of the house depended on the wealth of the owner. The smallest and poorest were the cottages of serfs. The houses were built on a rectangular plan, and composed of alternating beams arranged and interlocking in the corners. The lowest beam of the cottage, called the foundation, rested on stones set under the corners. These cottages had no chimneys and were entirely covered with thatch. Thatched roofs were characteristic of almost all rural buildings, regardless of the wealth of the owner. Even during the interwar period, roofs covered with tiles were rare.

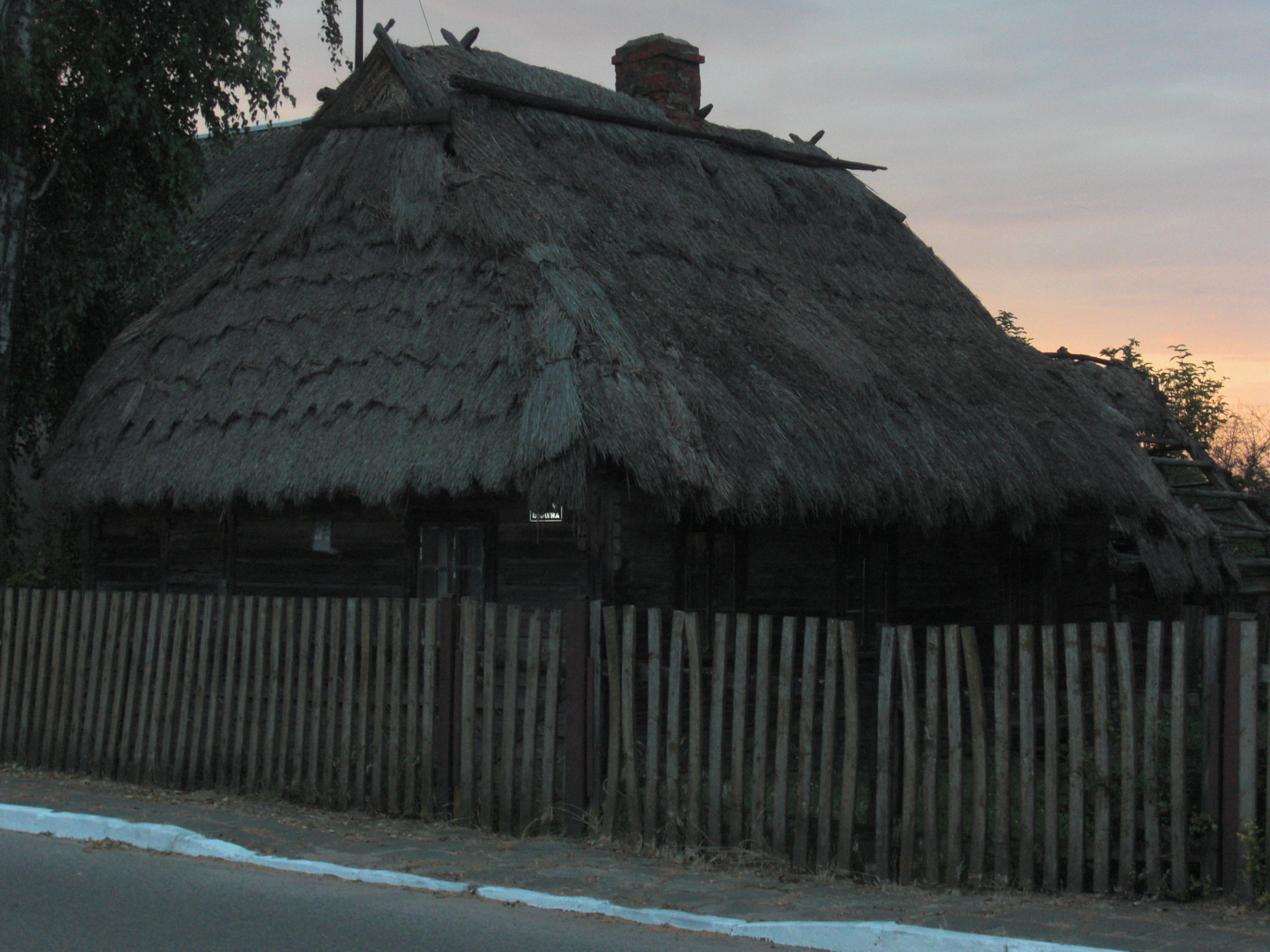
Hous in Dubicze Cerkiewne

A serf's cottage usually consisted of only one room, a chamber and a hall. The interior of the room was whitewashed with lime. The chamber was a kind of warehouse, where food was kept. Cottages of moderately wealthy and wealthy farmers were also made of wood, but they had more living rooms. There could be three (trojak), less often – four (czworak) and very rarely – five. Trojaks consisted of a large room, an alcove, a chamber and a hall. According to Marian Pokropek, this type of building was known at least since the 16th-17th century. In addition, there was a double house, which had a double layout of rooms compared to the triple house. The double house had a porch, considered a characteristic feature of the construction of the minor nobility. In the 19th century, all houses were covered with a hipped roof. At the beginning of the 20th century, it was replaced with a gable roof.

After the abolition of serfdom in Poland in 1861, there was an increase in wealth, and with it the size and appearance of the house changed.

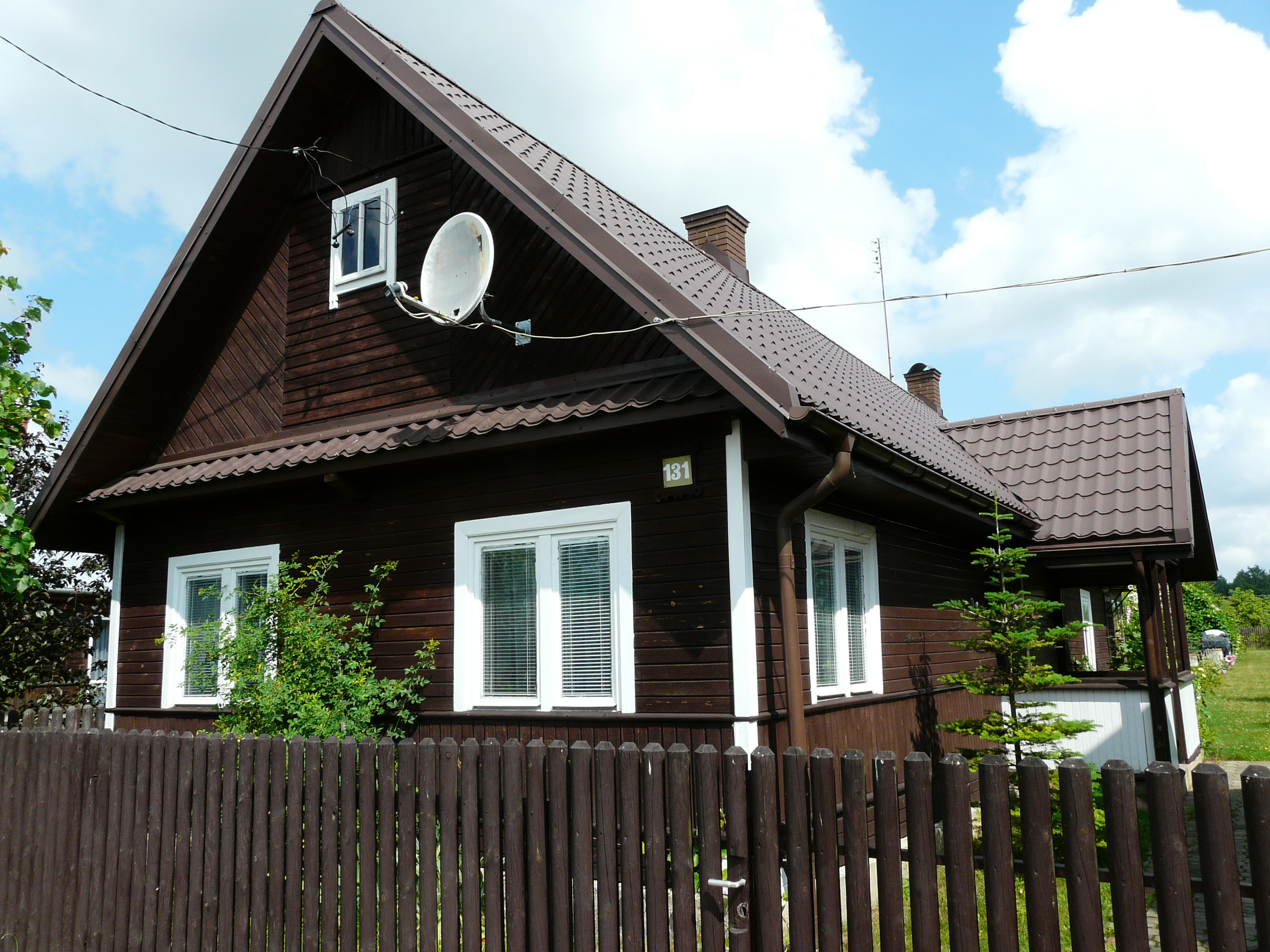
House number 131 in Białowieża

A major shift in rural house construction in the 19th century was the introduction of clay stoves and chimneys. These replaced the old gable smoke holes, making homes warmer and more airtight. As the population grew, land plots first allocated under Queen Bona became increasingly divided, leaving families with narrower parcels and driving up housing density. Yards turned long and narrow, which often forced builders to position houses with their gables facing the street. To maximize space, living quarters were placed under one roof alongside livestock buildings. This gave rise to the Bielsko-Hajnówka style farmstead, typical of areas settled by people of Ruthenian origin. These houses were about five meters wide but could stretch over forty meters in length. Starting from the street, the first room was usually a pigsty—often used for a horse—followed by a pantry, hallway, kitchen, bedroom, prystienok, and finally more livestock quarters. This layout meant the gable walls of the living area also served as gable walls for the pigsty and prystienok, helping the entire structure retain heat through the winter.

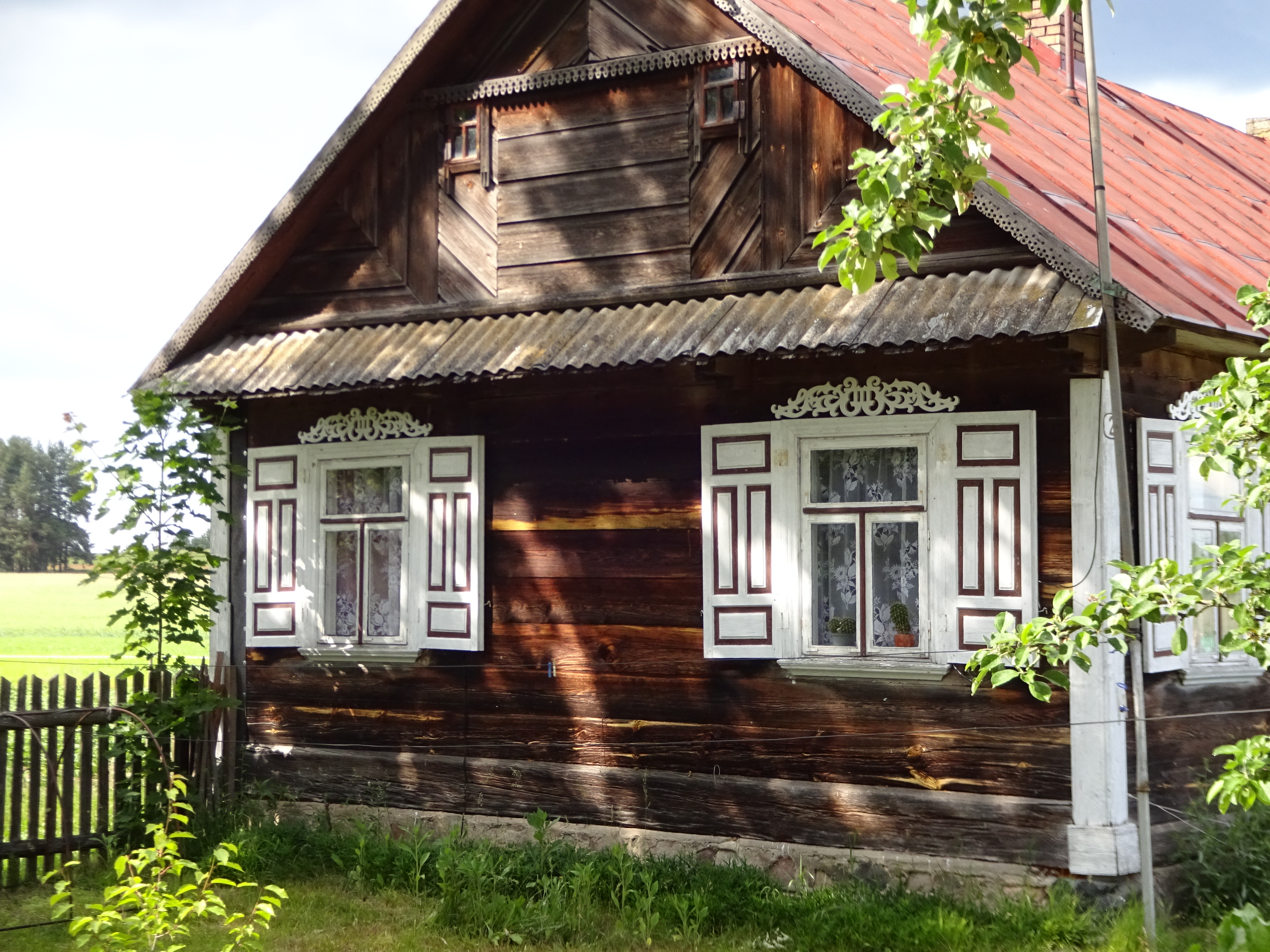
A house in Dubińska Ferma

The entrance room in a typical house was the hall (sień). This space served as an anteroom, with doors leading to the kitchen on one side and the larder on the other. It also functioned as a utility room, where groats were pounded in the stupa and grain was ground into flour using the zorna. Next to the hall was a dark chamber with only a small window, used as a pantry. Here families stored not just food, but also their best clothes and other valuable items. Pantries were often locked—not only against thieves but sometimes even against children eager to raid the food supply. Opposite the pantry door, across the hall, was the entrance to the kitchen. In poorer households, the kitchen doubled as the family’s only living space, while wealthier homes sometimes had a separate bedroom or an additional living room connected to it. Near the ceiling of most kitchens was a trama, a shelf fastened to the beams, where bread, utensils, and other small items were kept.

An important place in the main room was the Icon corner where families kept icons adorned with embroidered towels and gathered for prayer. Another notable feature was the szlabanok, an improved bench with a backrest that, when unfolded, provided more sleeping space than a traditional bench.

The hall, pantry, kitchen, and bedroom formed only the residential part of a Bielsko-Hajnówka-style homestead. Attached to it was the prystienok, a room entered from the yard, used for storing potatoes, fresh vegetables, pickled cucumbers, and sauerkraut. Beyond this were the chliwy, or livestock quarters. While houses and animal buildings were always constructed in a continuous line, the szpichieryk (granary) and the kłunia (barn) were built separately. This practice offered protection in case of fire, since the hope was that not all buildings would burn at once. With small plots forcing dense construction and roofs covered with straw, fires could spread quickly and devastate an entire village.

This style of planning and architecture remained dominant until the time of the Bieżeństwo (mass wartime exodus during World War I). Following the end of the war and the establishment of the Second Polish Republic, traditional designs gradually gave way to houses built apart from livestock quarters. Additionally, a fashion for decorating houses appeared., partly inspired by what returning refugees had seen in Russia. After World War II and the establishment of the Polish People's Republic, new building materials reached the countryside, and brick houses began to appear. The wooden Bielsko-Hajnówka farmstead, like the earlier huts, eventually disappeared.

== See also ==
- Izba
- Mazanka
