= The Crooked Circle =

The Crooked Circle may refer to:

- The Crooked Circle (1932 film), an American comedy / mystery film directed by H. Bruce Humberstone
- The Crooked Circle (1957 film), an American drama film directed by Joseph Kane

== See also ==
- Crooked Circle Club, a discussion club for young intelligentsia in Poland from 1955 to 1962
