= Przewłoka, Podlaskie Voivodeship =

Przewłoka
- Settlement
- Location within Poland
- Coordinates: 52°37′35″N 23°43′14″E
- Country: Poland
- Voivodeship: Podlaskie
- County: Hajnówka
- Gmina: Białowieża
- Population: 10

Przewłoka (Polish pronunciation: [pʂɛˈvwɔka]) is a settlement in the administrative district of Gmina Białowieża, within Hajnówka County, Podlaskie Voivodeship, in north-eastern Poland, close to the border with Belarus.
