= Jan Józef Lipski =

Polish critic, literature historian, politician and freemason

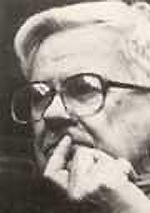
- Jan Józef Lipski
- Born: 26 May 1926; Warsaw, Poland
- Died: 10 September 1991 (aged 65); Kraków, Poland
- Occupations: Writer, Senator in the Republic of Poland
- Writing career
- Notable awards: Cross of Valour; Order of the White Eagle

Jan Józef Lipski (26 May 1926 – 10 September 1991) was a Polish critic, literature historian, politician and freemason. As a soldier of the Home Army (Armia Krajowa), he fought in the Warsaw Uprising. Editor of collected works by Jan Kasprowicz, Benedykt Chmielowski and Gabriela Zapolska.

== Political life ==
Between 1956 and 1957 Lipski was an editor of the pro-reform weekly "Po prostu"; from 1957 to 1959 he was president of the Crooked Circle Club. In 1964 Lipski organized the Letter of the 34 (objecting to the expansion of censorship in communist Poland). In 1975 he signed the Letter of 59 and in 1976 he co-founded the Workers' Defence Committee (Komitet Obrony Robotnikow); as one of the most active members of this organization he organized help for the workers who protested in June 1976 against the government sponsored price increases in Radom and in Ursus district of Warsaw.

In 1980, Lipski became a member of the Solidarity Union and was elected a delegate to the 1st Delegates' Rally to represent the Masovia Region (based in Warsaw). On December 14, 1981, after the imposition of the martial law, he was arrested and charged with orchestrating a protest.

As the only senior member of the non-communist opposition, he re-established the Polish Socialist Party (Polska Partia Socjalistyczna), which he led from 1987. In 1989 he was elected Senator from Radom and was a member of the Civic Parliamentary Club (Obywatelski Klub Parlamentarny); he died during his term in office.

== Honours and awards ==
On December 8, 1969, Lipski received the Armia Krajowa Cross, and on December 12, 1969 he was awarded the Medal of the Army for the fourth time. In 1984 awarded an honorary doctorate at the University of Paris X Nanterre.

For acts during the uprising, Lipski was decorated with the Cross of Valour (Krzyż Walecznych) ("for lifetime achievement, for the brave stance in the street fighting of 25 September, for persevering in a shed at the police station giving a small fire under a strong defence, where he was wounded, and for active participation in patrols"), posthumously awarded the Grand Cross of the Order of Polonia Restituta (by Polish President Lech Wałęsa on 13 September 1991) and with the highest Polish decoration, the Order of the White Eagle (by President Lech Kaczyński, 23 September 2006).

In 2000, Jacek Kuroń established the Jan Józef Lipski Open University of Teremiski.

== Publications in English ==
1. KOR: a history of the Workers' Defense Committee in Poland, 1976-1981. Berkeley: University of California Press. 1985. ISBN 0-520-05243-9.

== Publications in Polish ==
- Twórczość Jana Kasprowicza, Państwowy Instytut Wydawniczy, Warszawa 1967
- Warszawscy "pustelnicy" i "bywalscy", Państwowy Instytut Wydawniczy, Warszawa 1973 (dwutomowa antologia felietonu prasowego)
- Komitet Obrony Robotników KOR – komitet samoobrony społecznej, Aneks, London 1983; 2nd ed. Instytut Pamięci Narodowej, Warszawa 2006
- Dwie ojczyzny – dwa patriotyzmy. Uwagi o megalomanii narodowej i ksenofobii Polaków, Kultura, Paris 1981
- Szkice o poezji, Instytut Literacki, Paryż 1987
- Tunika Nessosa. Szkice o literaturze i nacjonalizmie, PEN, Warszawa 1992
- Katolickie Państwo Narodu Polskiego, Aneks, Londyn 1994
- Powiedzieć sobie wszystko ...: eseje o sąsiedztwie polsko-niemieckim - Wir müssen uns alles sagen... Essays zur deutsch-polnischen Nachbarschaft, Wydawnictwo Polsko-Niemieckie, Warszawa 1996 (bilingual German-Polish edition)
