= Białowieża =

- Village
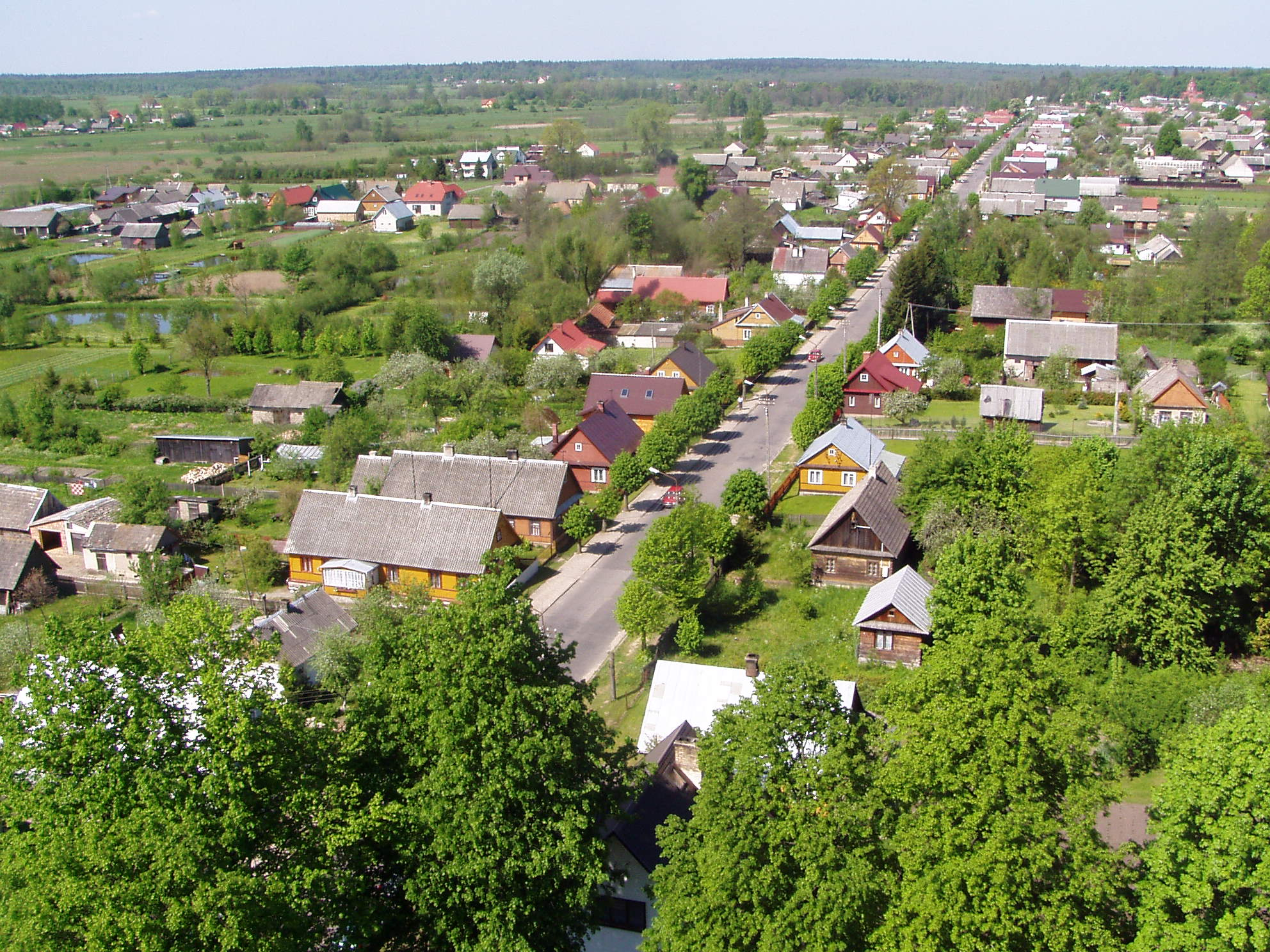

- Coat of arms
- Interactive map of Białowieża
- Location within Poland
- Coordinates: 52°42′N 23°52′E
- Country: Poland
- Voivodeship: Podlaskie
- Powiat: Hajnówka
- Gmina: Białowieża
- Established: 1699
- Population (2002): 2,670
- Time zone: UTC+1 (CET)
  - Summer (DST): UTC+2 (CEST)
- Postal code: 17-230
- Area code: +48 85
- Car Plates: BHA
- Website: www.bialowieza.biaman.pl

Białowieża [bʲawɔˈvʲɛʐa] is a village in Poland's Podlaskie Voivodeship, in the middle of the Białowieża Forest, to which it gave its name.

== Location ==
Białowieża is in eastern Poland, in Podlaskie Voivodeship, near Poland's border with Belarus. The Narewka River flows through Białowieża.

It lies on provincial road No. 689 running from Bielsk Podlaski. It used to be an important point on the former trade route from Grodno to Brest-Litovsk. Since 2005 there has been a Polish-Belarusian pedestrian and bicycle border crossing in Grudki, 4 km (2 mi) from the village. Bialowieza is the terminus of the (active until 1994) railroad line to Hajnówka.

Białowieża is the seat of the administrative district of Gmina Białowieża. Other villages in the district are Budy, Gródek, Pogorzelce, and Teremiski.

== History ==
Manor on Białowieża Hill, 1821

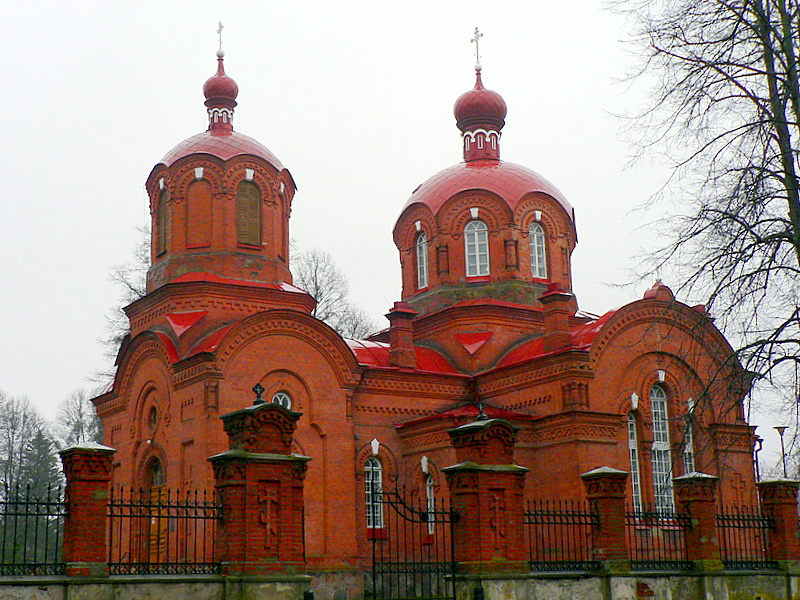
St. Nicholas' Orthodox church, in Białowieża

Before 1426, a wooden hunting lodge was built for King Władysław Jagiełło on the Łutownia River, in the middle of the Białowieża Forest. The lodge was probably one of the area's first permanent settlements, though the forest had already been penetrated by hunters from nearby areas and by the King himself, who hunted there. The wooden lodge was painted white and became the namesake for both the future village and the forest (Białowieża means White Tower in Polish).

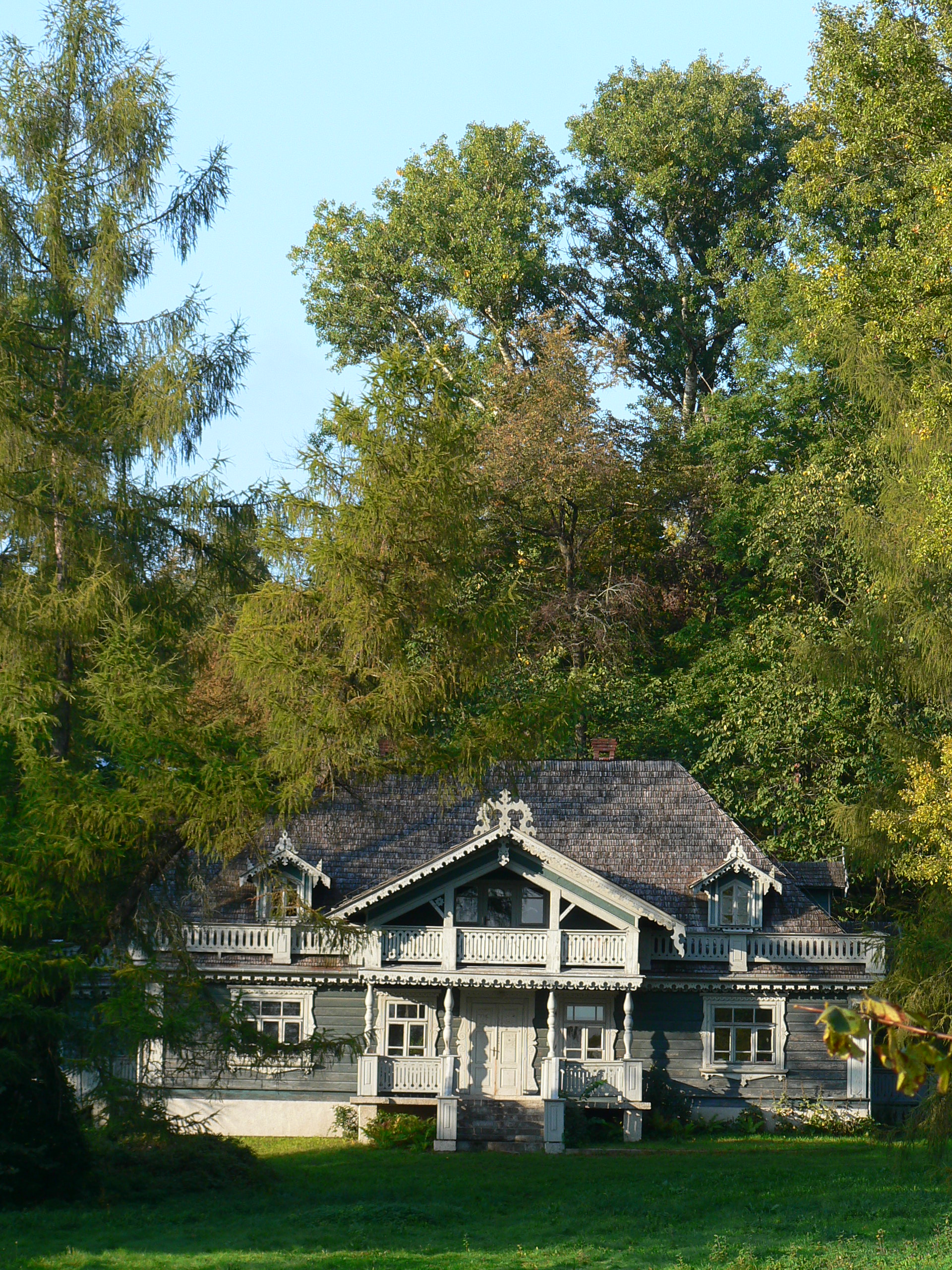
Hunting lodge, Białowieża's oldest surviving building

From 1538, the forest was protected by the laws of King Sigismund I the Old. However, until the times of John Casimir the forest was mostly unpopulated. Sporadic settlements were established in various places, but the manor in Białowieża was the only one to be permanent. In the late 17th century, several small villages were started for development of local iron ore deposits and tar production. The villages were populated with settlers from Mazovia and Podlachia and many of them still exist.

At the end of the 16th century, probably around 1594, the royal court was moved to the area of today's Białowieża Glade. According to the inventory from 1696, Białowieża was a 25-morgic farm in the period in question. In 1710 Białowieża was affected by a plague epidemic. The settlement and the royal hunting court were burnt down, and the residents who avoided infection moved to a new place. About the burned village is reminiscent of a wooden Orthodox cross set up by the Browska Road, which according to one version means the place where the wooden Orthodox church was located, according to the other, the place where the village once ended. In the mid-eighteenth century, August III built a new hunting palace in the area of today's Palace Park, whose first description comes from an inventory from 1773. On September 27, 1752, August III organized a great hunt in the Białowieża Forest. To commemorate this event, a sandstone obelisk was erected near the palace, in which the names of the hunting entourage and the number of slaughtered animals were engraved in Polish and German. In 1765-1780 Białowieża was ruled by the Lithuanian court Treasurer Antoni Tyzenhauz. In 1784 King Stanisław August Poniatowski came to Białowieża. There were the last royal hunts in the Białowieża Forest.

As a result of the Third Partition of Poland in 1795, Białowieża found itself within the borders of the Russian Empire (Russian partition of Poland). After the Partitions of Poland the local population was turned into serfs and Białowieża quickly depopulated. Tsar Alexander I reintroduced the reserve in 1801 and hired a small amount of peasants for protection of the animals. Most of them were settled in the administrative centre of the area – Białowieża. However, since most of the foresters took part in the November Uprising (500 out of 502 in total), their posts were abolished and protection was again harmed. Yet again the village of Białowieża ceased to exist. Protection was reintroduced in 1860 and the village was repopulated with Russians.

The rapid development of Białowieża took place after 1888, when the settlement was incorporated into tsarist estates. In 1889–1894 a large hunting palace was built, designed by Nicholas de Rochefort. A number of buildings were built in the vicinity of the palace: The Świcki (Hunting House) with comfortable, separate rooms, a common billiard room, baths for the tsar's dawn (burned down in 1962), the Hofmarszałkowski House for court marshals (built in 1904), kitchen buildings, palace stable for 40 horses, laundry, telephone station, power plant (demolished in 1978), electric mill, house for servicing horses, house of the palace supervisor, house of shooters (built in 1904), woodcutter, cold store, bakery, house for preparation of forest animals, etc. As a result, a large housing estate was created. In 1895, an English-style palace park was created with an area of approximately 50 ha, designed by Walerian Kronenberg. At that time, another park with an area of 20 ha was established in another part of Białowieża, also according to the design of Kronenberg, surrounding the seat of the Board of the Appanaged Forest. Originally called a regiment, in the interwar period it received the name of the Directorate Park, which is preserved until today. Seven clerical houses were built in this area. In 1895, construction was completed and a new stone church of St. Nicholas the Wonderworker, located near the palace.

During World War I most of the local Eastern Orthodox (different nationalities) population fled before the advancing German army which seized the area in August 1915. Catholics remained in the village (being ethnic Poles, but also partly Orthodox Poles) The Germans built a lumber mill in Białowieża, connected to the nearby town of Hajnówka by a railway. However, the village did not recover until 1921 when the Białowieża National Park was established. The village became the administrative center of the Park and one of the most popular tourist attractions of the area. Following the Polish-Soviet War, Białowieża was returned to Poland.

On 1 September 1939, with the onset of World War II and joint German and Soviet attack on Poland, Luftwaffe bombed Bialowieza. The bombs seriously damaged the church and, to a lesser extent, a military field hospital located in one of the wings of the palace. Then Białowieża was taken over by the German 3rd Armoured Division. On September 16, Podlaska Cavalry Brigade entered Białowieża. On September 20, General Zygmunt Podhorski pseud. "Zaza" appointed from the gathered units of the Suwalska Cavalry Brigade and the Podlaska Cavalry Brigade the improvised Cavalry Division "Zaza" consisting of the Cavalry Brigade "Pleats" and the Cavalry Brigade "Edward".

In accordance with Molotov–Ribbentrop Pact, the settlement and the forest came under Soviet occupation and was declared part of the Belastok Region of the Byelorussian SSR. In 1939 and 1940 many local inhabitants were arrested and deported to Siberia. Many were arrested and sent to the Gulag. They were replaced with Russian forest workers, but in 1941 the forest came under German occupation and the Russian inhabitants were also deported. An Amtskommissariat was established in Białowieża, reporting directly to the Kreiskommissariat in Bielsk Podlaski. It was located in the Catholic rectory, from which the priest had been evicted. The first Amtskommissariat was Hugo Scharfenort, followed by Albert Schartnorez and after 1943, Zezmann and Maller. Over 100 surrounding settlements and villages were under the Amtskommissariat's jurisdiction.

Hermann Göring planned to create the biggest hunting reserve in the world there, but those plans were never realized. After July 1941, the forest became a refuge for both Polish and Soviet partisans. The German authorities organized mass executions of people suspected of aiding the resistance. In July 1944 the area was captured by the Red Army. The withdrawing Wehrmacht blew up the historic Białowieża hunting manor.

After the war Białowieża was transferred back to the communist Polish People's Republic, yet again recovered and in 1947 the settlement became the center of the re-established Białowieża National Park. Nowadays it is one of the least populated areas in Poland, while at the same time it is one of the most important tourist attractions in the eastern part of the country with almost 100,000 visitors every year. The Reserve was inscribed on the World Heritage List in 1992 and internationally recognized as a Biosphere Reserve under UNESCO's Man and the Biosphere Program in 1993.

British historian Simon Schama devotes several chapters of his 1995 book Landscape and Memory to a consideration of the historical vicissitudes of the forests around Białowieża in an effort to explore the ways in which cultural imagination shapes humans' vision of the land.

== Demographics ==
Today, the majority of the population of Białowieża is Eastern Orthodox mostly identifying themselves as Poles, with a small part identifying as members of the Belarusian ethnic minority. There is also a significant percentage of Catholics living in Białowieża. The local native dialect is described by linguists as being of Ruthenian origin, predominantly a mixture of Belarusian, Ukrainian with significant elements of Polish and a certain influence of the Russian language. However, this dialect is gradually disappearing and an increasing part of the population of Białowieża uses standard Polish or Podlasie-Polesian dialects of the Polish language.

=== Jews ===
Jewish community in Białowieża established in the late 19th century and shortly before World War I. M. Orlowicz reported that the synagogue was already in operation before 1914. Jews came to Białowieża at a time when the foundations of the timber industry were being laid in the settlement. In 1917, there were about 80 Jews living here, in 1921 217 Jews, and in 1937 4,000 Jews. The largest concentration of Jewish houses and squares was located along the main, Stoczek street. The main wooden synagogue and a private house of prayer were located on Stoczek Street. There was no Jewish cemetery in the town. Jews from Białowieża were buried in the Jewish cemetery in Narewka. There was also no rabbi. For special prayers, a rabbi would come from the surrounding settlements, most often from Narewka.

The main synagogue was built at the beginning of the 20th century and dismantled in the 1960s. It stood behind the "Sarenka" restaurant. During the German occupation it was used as a feed warehouse. Traces of the foundations was still visible in the 90s. The brick house of prayer was set up in a private house in the 1920s by a Jew who came from the Caucasus, located at 61 Stoczek Street.

== Sites of interest ==
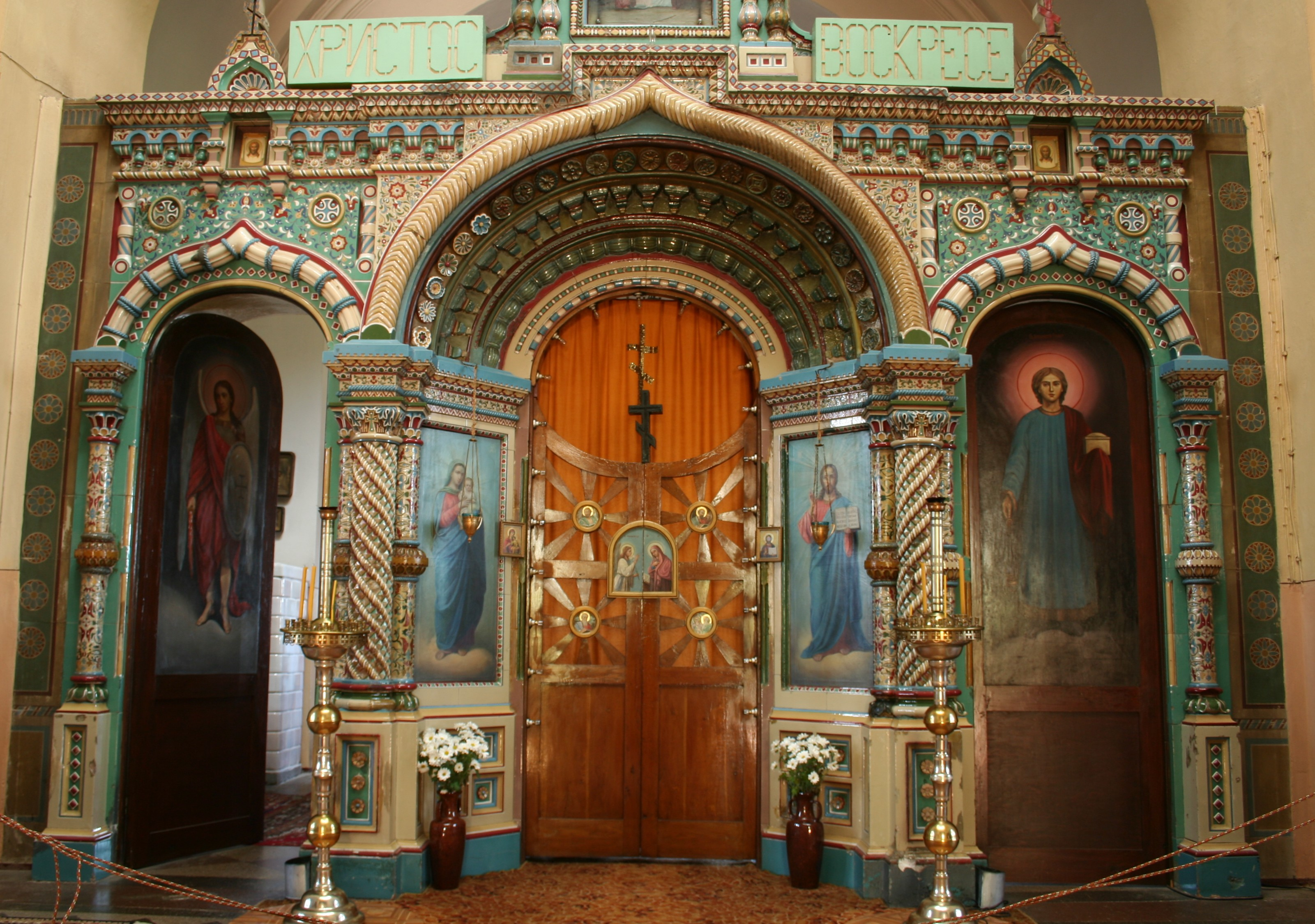
Iconostasis in St. Nicholas' Orthodox church

- Białowieża National Park
- Palace park (Park Pałacowy) - covering the area of 470,000 m^{2} (5,059,037.90 sq ft), built in 1890. It is a park in English style with a large view to Białowieża National Park. Upon the ponds there is an obelisk for the memory of hunting in 1752 when king Augustus III hunted in Białowieża forests. There are also several tsarist red brick buildings from the 19th century, and a gate which is the only remnant of the wooden manor.
- Ecological Museum (Muzeum Przyrodniczo-Leśne im. prof. Jana Miklaszewskiego) - museum of natural history
- St. Nicholas the Miraculous' Orthodox Church - with a unique iconostasis from Chinese porcelain.
- Open-air folk museum (Skansen) - with original huts, windmills and wells
- PTTK Tourist Service
- Nature expert guides (birdwatching, bison and other wildlife observations) you can find at the Białowieża Forest website
- Graveyard Chapel of St. Cyril (Kaplica św. Cyryla) - from 1873 with an 18th-century icon.

== Notable people ==
- Gavriil Ilizarov, Soviet orthopedic surgeon, known for inventing the Ilizarov apparatus for lengthening limb bones and for his eponymous surgery.
- Igor Newerly, Polish novelist and educator, member of the Polish resistance during the Nazi German occupation of Poland.
- Aleksander Waszkiewicz, Soviet military officer
- Albert Ordway (born Albert Asoŭski), Belarusian politician and military commander, member of the Rada of the Belarusian Democratic Republic
- Hieorhi Vałkavycki, Belarusian poet and writer

== See also ==
- Białowieża Forest
- Podlaskie Voivodeship
