= Gmina Białowieża =

Gmina Białowieża Białowieża Commune
- Gmina
- Coat of arms
- Interactive map of Gmina Białowieża
- Coordinates (Białowieża): 52°42′4″N 23°52′10″E
- Country: Poland
- Voivodeship: Podlaskie
- County: Hajnówka
- Seat: Białowieża

Area
  - Total: 203.2 km^{2} (78.5 sq mi)

Population (2006)
  - Total: 2,691
  - Density: 13.24/km^{2} (34.30/sq mi)
- Website: https://www.bialowieza.gmina.pl/

Gmina Białowieża is a rural gmina (administrative district) in Hajnówka County, Podlaskie Voivodeship, in north-eastern Poland, on the border with Belarus. Its seat is the village of Białowieża, which lies approximately 21 kilometres (13 mi) east of Hajnówka and 66 km (41 mi) south-east of the regional capital Białystok.

The gmina covers an area of 203.2 square kilometres (78.5 sq mi), and as of 2006 its total population is 2,691.

== Villages ==
Gmina Białowieża contains the villages and settlements of Białowieża, Czerlonka, Grudki, Podcerkwy, Podolany, Pogorzelce, Przewłoka, Teremiski and Zwierzyniec.

== Neighbouring gminas ==
Gmina Białowieża is bordered by the gminas of Hajnówka, Narew and Narewka. It also borders Belarus.
