= Zwierzyniec, Podlaskie Voivodeship =

Zwierzyniec
- Settlement
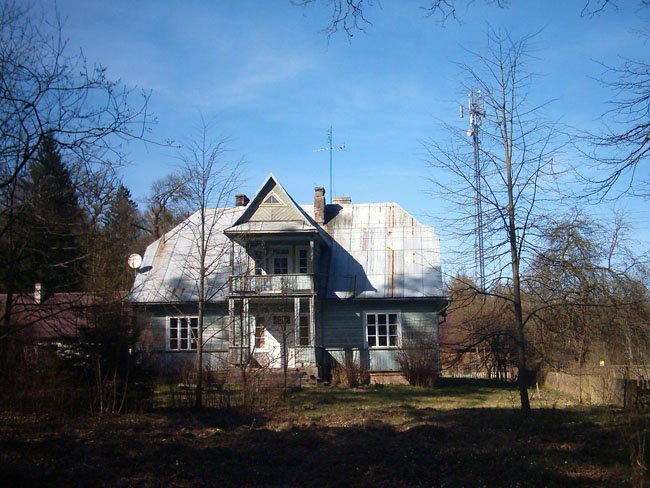

- Location within Poland
- Coordinates: 52°42′24″N 23°43′46″E
- Country: Poland
- Voivodeship: Podlaskie
- County: Hajnówka
- Gmina: Białowieża

Zwierzyniec (Polish pronunciation: [zvjɛˈʐɨɲɛt͡s]) is a settlement in the administrative district of Gmina Białowieża, within Hajnówka County, Podlaskie Voivodeship, in north-eastern Poland, close to the border with Belarus.
