= Podcerkwy =

- Settlement
- Location within Poland
- Coordinates: 52°39′26″N 23°46′7″E
- Country: Poland
- Voivodeship: Podlaskie
- County: Hajnówka
- Gmina: Białowieża

Podcerkwy [pɔtˈt͡sɛrkfɨ] is a settlement in the administrative district of Gmina Białowieża, within Hajnówka County, Podlaskie Voivodeship, in north-eastern Poland, close to the border with Belarus.
