= Grudki =

- Village
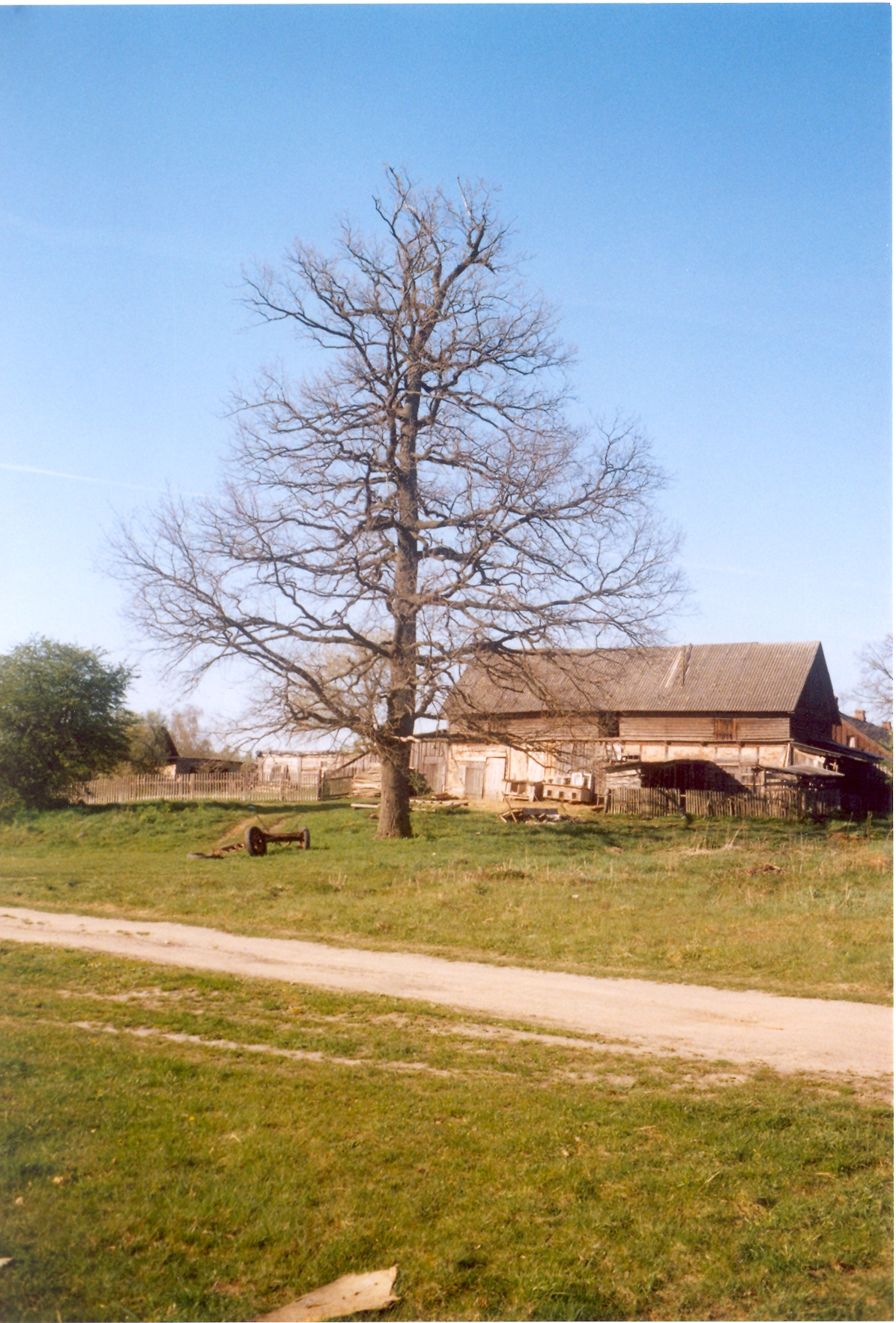

- Location within Poland
- Coordinates: 52°41′6″N 23°49′30″E
- Country: Poland
- Voivodeship: Podlaskie
- County: Hajnówka
- Gmina: Białowieża

Grudki [ˈɡrutki] is a village in the administrative district of Gmina Białowieża, within Hajnówka County, Podlaskie Voivodeship, in north-eastern Poland, close to the border with Belarus.
