= Czerlonka =

- Village
- Location within Poland
- Coordinates: 52°41′24″N 23°43′21″E
- Country: Poland
- Voivodeship: Podlaskie
- County: Hajnówka
- Gmina: Białowieża
- Population: 120

Czerlonka [t͡ʂɛrˈlɔnka] is a village in the administrative district of Gmina Białowieża, within Hajnówka County, Podlaskie Voivodeship, in north-eastern Poland, close to the border with Belarus.
