= Teremiski =

- Village
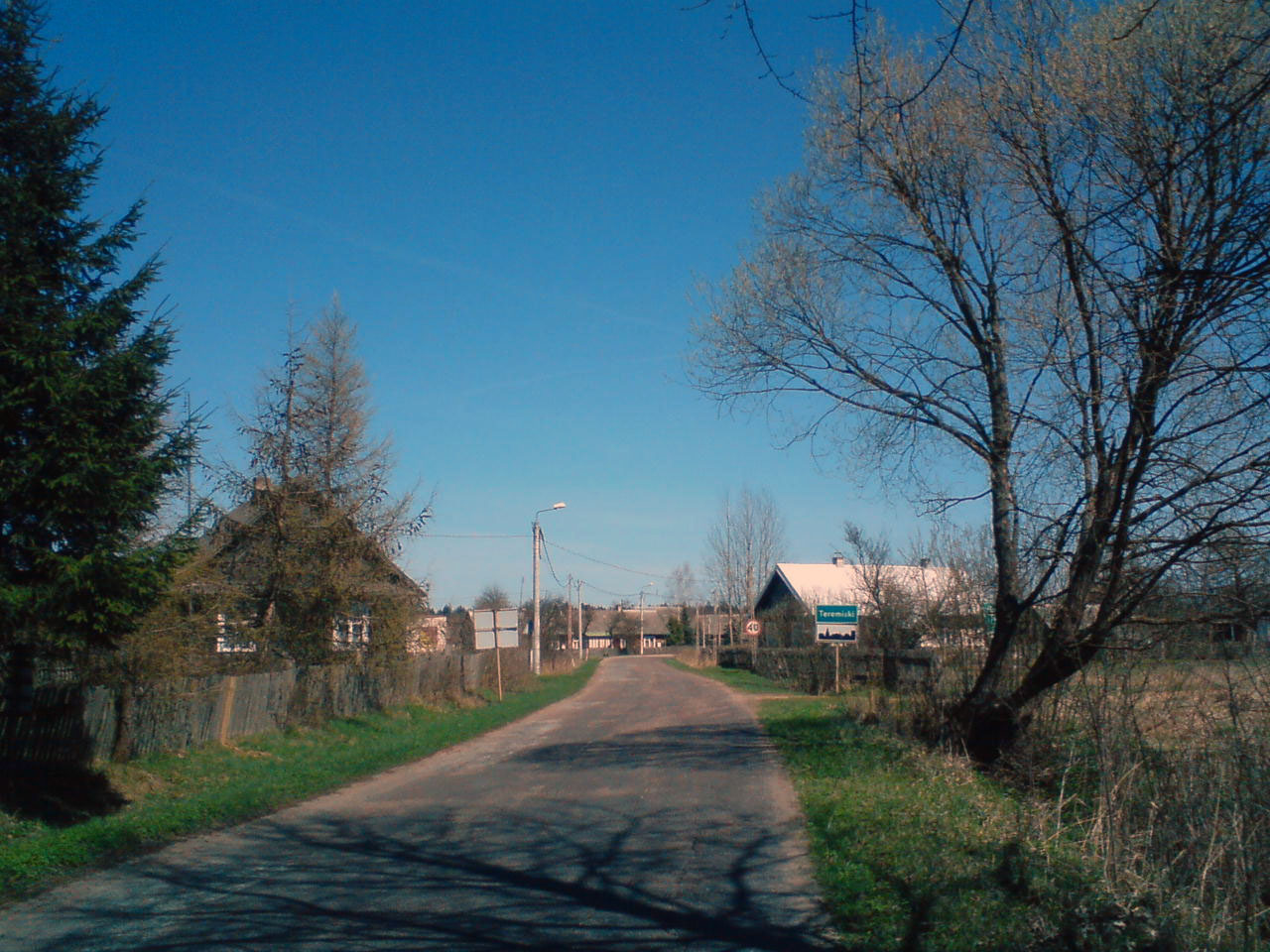

- Location within Poland
- Coordinates: 52°44′N 23°46′E
- Country: Poland
- Voivodeship: Podlaskie
- County: Hajnówka
- Gmina: Białowieża

Teremiski [tɛrɛˈmiski] is a village in the administrative district of Gmina Białowieża, within Hajnówka County, Podlaskie Voivodeship, in north-eastern Poland, close to the border with Belarus.

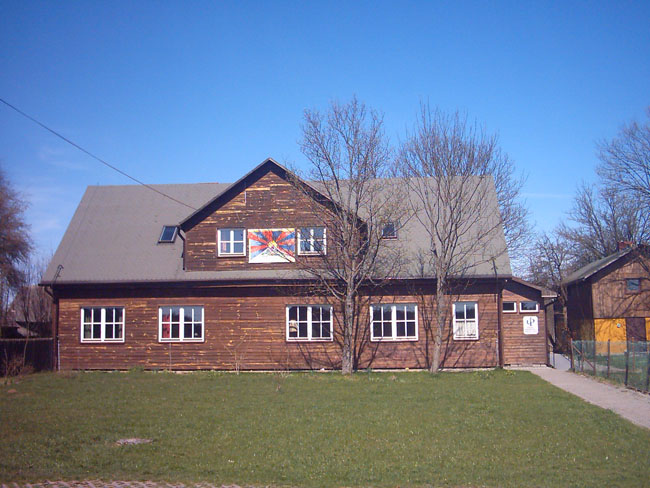
The location of Common University

The village, with less than 20 houses, one shop and a bus stop, is nevertheless the location of a summer university, one of a number of such folk institutions of learning known in Poland from before World War II. It is called the Jan Józef Lipski Common University in Teremiski (Uniwersytet Powszechny w Teremiskach), founded in 2000 by Jacek Kuroń with wife Danuta.

This unofficial cultural institution, offering summer lectures by university staff visiting from countries such as Israel, is associated with the task, among others, of disseminating social knowledge and models of participation in cultural developments in places, where the continuity of the contact with culture has been broken. The facility includes Lecture Hall and a Dormitory. Lipski became its first dean, and manager of its Educational Foundation.
