= Crooked Circle Club =

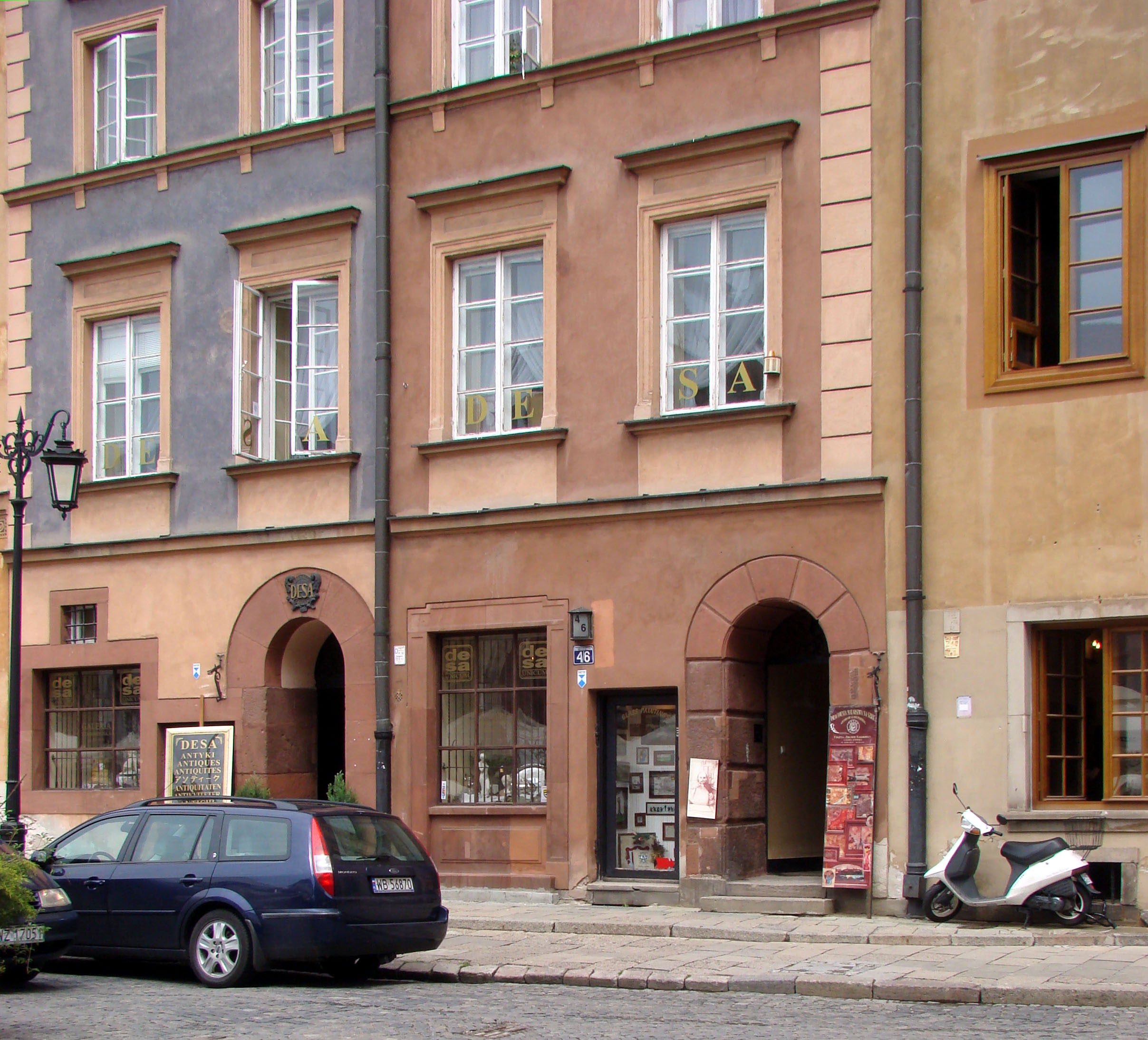
Former meeting place of the club

The Crooked Circle Club (Polish: Klub Krzywego Koła) was a discussion club for young intelligentsia in Poland. It was founded in 1955, the first meeting taking place in an apartment on Crooked Circle Street in Warsaw. It had connections with the Po prostu magazine. The club then expanded, and met regularly at the Old Town Market Place, Warsaw every Thursday at six in the evening. The club played an important role during Polish October and the de-Stalinization of Poland, organizing other clubs and contacts. The club was heavily involved in the 1957 Polish legislative election. Matters suppressed by government censorship were discussed openly and frankly in the club. After First Secretary Władysław Gomułka tightened his control in 1957, other discussion clubs were closed and the Crooked Circle Club was challenged as well though it survived as the only discussion club in Poland managed by its director Jan Józef Lipski. The club closed in 1962.

Several members of the club received awards for their work, including: Paweł Jasienica, Jan Wolski, Władysław Bartoszewski, Leszek Kołakowski, and Henryk Stażewski.
