= Podlaskie Museum of Folk Culture =

Open-air museum in Białystok, Poland

- Podlaskie Muzeum Kultury Ludowej
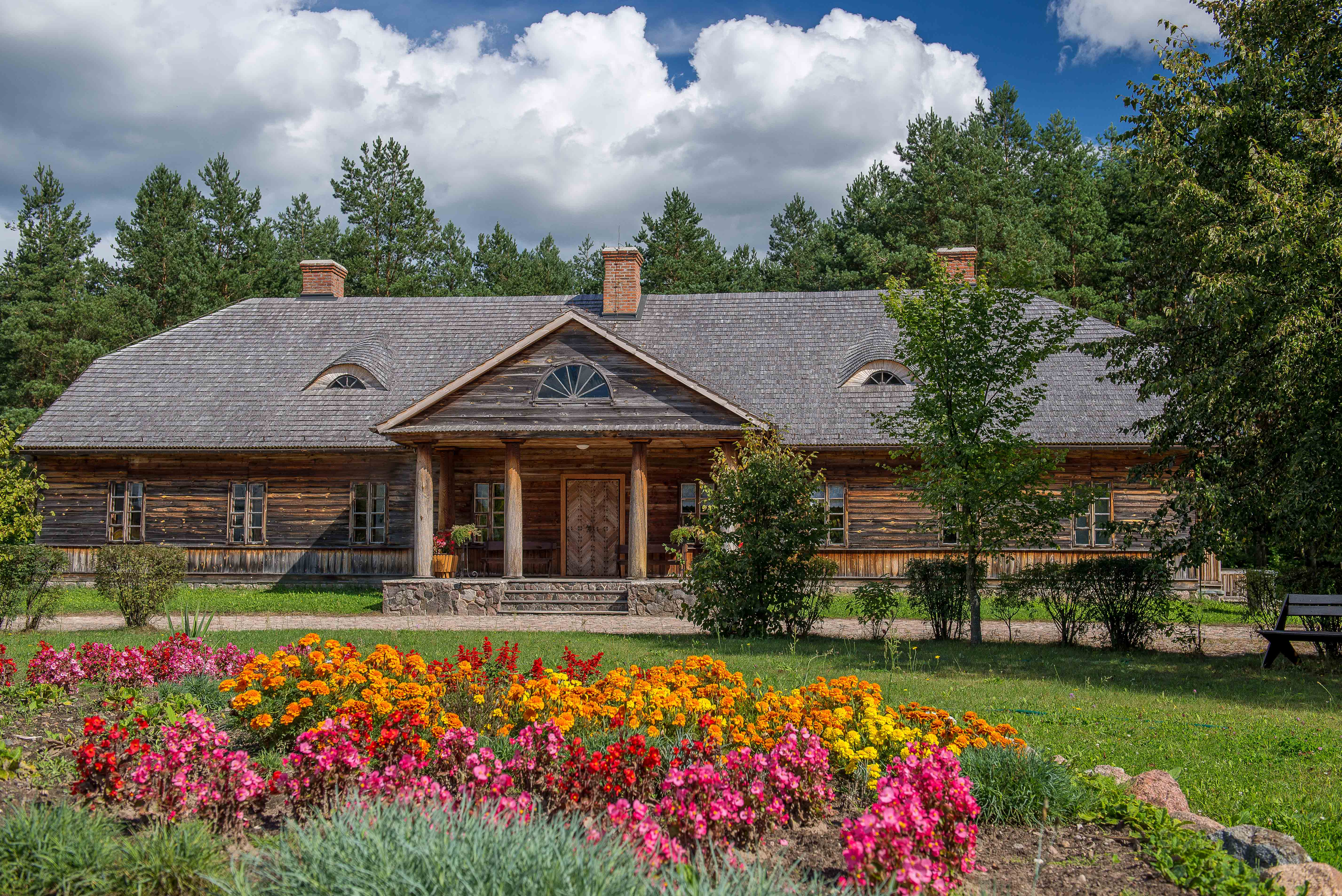
- Traditional house in the museum
- Established: 1982
- Location: 7 Leśna Street, Wasilków, Białystok County
- Coordinates: 53.176574°N 23.149020°E
- Website: www.skansen.bialystok.pl

Podlaskie Museum of Folk Culture (Polish: Podlaskie Muzeum Kultury Ludowej) (until September 2016, the Białystok Village Museum (Polish: Białostockie Muzeum Wsi)) is an open-air museum, gathering monuments of wooden architecture and ethnographic collections from the Białystok, Łomża and Suwałki regions. Established from the merger of the Białystok Village Museum and the Ethnography Department of the Podlaskie Museum, previously it was a branch of the Museum.

The museum is located at the northern borders of Białystok, in the settlement of Wasilków, on the road to Augustów.

== History ==
The Ethnography Department has been functioning since 1962, and the open-air museum was founded in 1982 as a branch of the then Regional Museum in Białystok. The open-air museum was to implement projects for the protection of wooden construction in the Bialystok region created in the sixties. The author of one of the first program assumptions was prof. Ignacy Tłoczek. The project was finally approved for implementation by authorship of prof. Marian Pokropk. He assumed the reconstruction of entire settlement systems occurring in north-eastern Poland, such as: terraced house, street house, small-hamlet hamlet, camp buildings as well as manor and forest complexes.
