= Bieżeństwo =

Mass evacuation during WWI

The Bieżeństwo (Belarusian: Бежaнствa, Ukrainian: Біженство, Russian: Беженство) was a mass evacuation during World War I, in Polish context and historiography also called exile, resettlement or displacement of the population, mainly of Orthodox faith, from the western governorates of the Russian Empire into the depths of Russia, after the German troops broke through the front line in the period from May 3 to September 1915. The apogee of the Bieżeństwo fell in the period from spring to autumn 1915.

== History ==
Due to the military failures of the Russian Imperial Army and the rapidly advancing offensive of the German Empire after the Battle of Gorlice, the Empire authorities began a wide-ranging propaganda campaign, calling on civilians to immediately evacuate into the depths of the Russian Empire. In order to persuade people to leave, they threatened them with murders, rapes, robberies and other cruel repressions that the local Orthodox population was to suffer at the hands of the Germans. Real events such as war crimes in Belgium (the burning of Leuven, mass executions in Dinant), the destruction of Kalisz or the incidents in Częstochowa at the beginning of the war could have contributed to the spread of such news. In this way, the scorched earth tactic was used. Families of officials, employees of many industrial plants, railway workers, etc. were also evacuated.

As a result of the agitation, 2 to 3 million people left their hometowns, including about 800 thousand residents of the Grodno Governorate. Up to 80% of the inhabitants left the lands east of Białystok. The chaotic flight into the depths of Russia lasting many months claimed many victims. The escape took place in the heat, without adequate food or even water. Graves of the dead remained by the roads, and some of the bodies were not buried. The conditions were conducive to outbreaks of epidemics and led to mass deaths of children.

One of the consequences of the evacuation was the evacuation of the Imperial Warsaw University to Rostov-on-Don, this evacuated university is today's Southern Federal University. Following the return of the deportees to Poland, a fashion began to decorate village houses in Podlachia region.
