= Nowoberezowo =

- Village
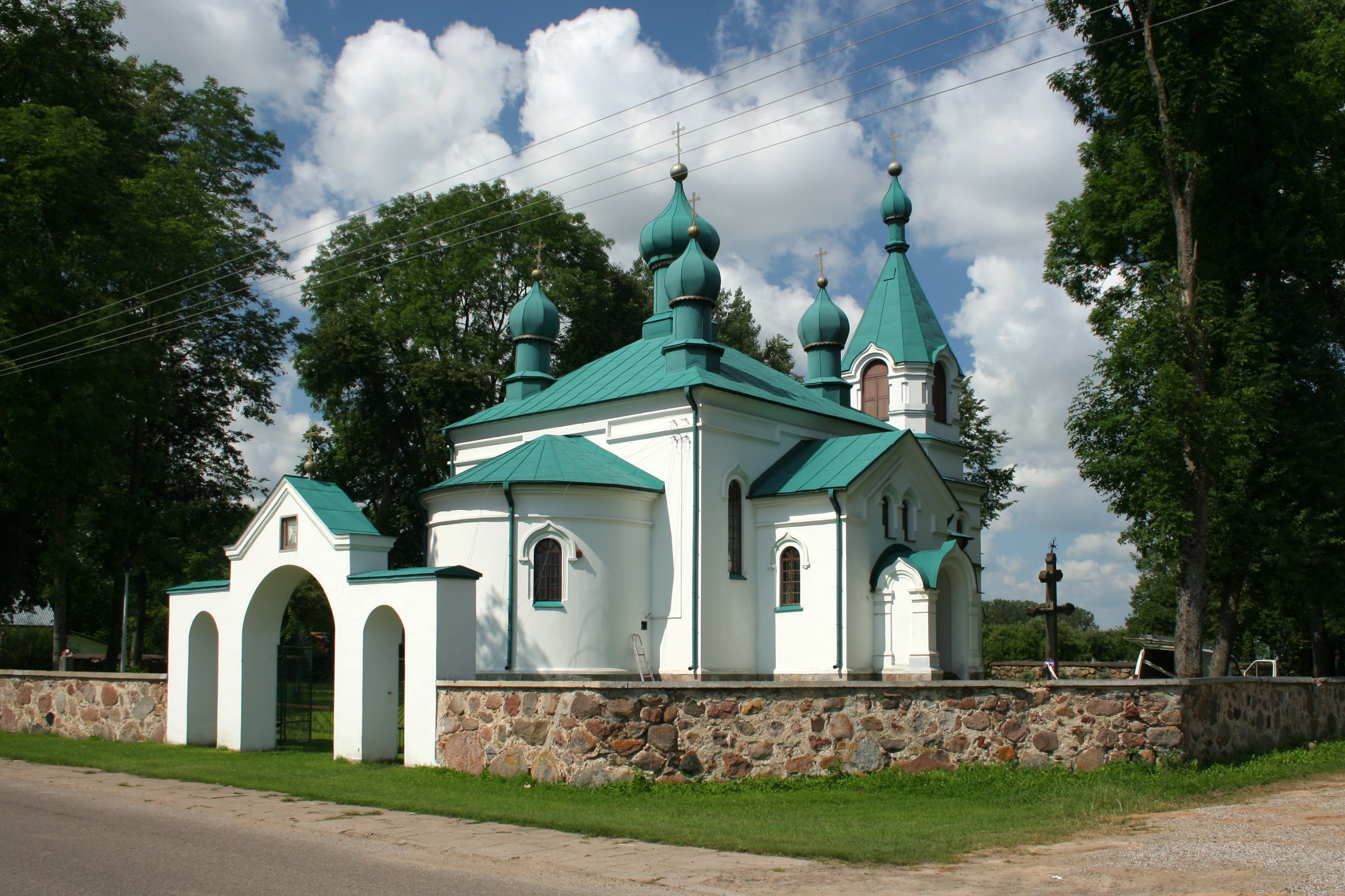
- Orthodox Church of the Ascension of Jesus Christ

- Location within Poland
- Coordinates: 52°45′N 23°30′E
- Country: Poland
- Voivodeship: Podlaskie
- County: Hajnówka
- Gmina: Hajnówka

Nowoberezowo [nɔvɔbɛrɛˈzɔvɔ] is a village in the administrative district of Gmina Hajnówka, within Hajnówka County, Podlaskie Voivodeship, in north-eastern Poland, close to the border with Belarus.
