= Wiktorzyn =

Wiktorzyn may refer to the following places:

- Wiktorzyn, Bielsk County in Podlaskie Voivodeship (north-east Poland)
- Wiktorzyn, Łomża County in Podlaskie Voivodeship (north-east Poland)
- Wiktorzyn, Wysokie Mazowieckie County in Podlaskie Voivodeship (north-east Poland)
- Wiktorzyn, Masovian Voivodeship (east-central Poland)
