= Abramiki =

- Hamlet
- Interactive map of Abramiki
- Country: Poland
- Voivodeship: Podlaskie Voivodeship
- County: Bielsk Podlaski
- Gmina: Wyszki

Abramiki [abramiki] is a hamlet in the village of Bujnowo, in the administrative district of Gmina Wyszki, within Bielsk Podlaski County, Podlaskie Voivodeship, in north-eastern Poland.
