= Adam Bargielski =

Polish Roman Catholic priest and martyr

Blessed Adam Bargielski
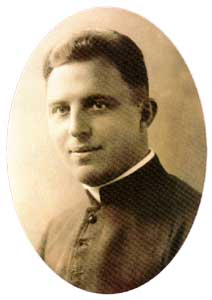

Martyr
- Born: 7 January 1903; Kalinowo, Łomża County, Poland
- Died: 8 September 1942 (aged 39); Dachau, Upper Bavaria, Germany
- Honored in: Roman Catholic Church
- Beatified: 13 June 1999 by Pope John Paul II
- Feast: 12 June

Adam Bargielski (January 7, 1903 – September 8, 1942) was a Polish Roman Catholic priest. He was born in Kalinowo, Łomża County. He died in the Nazi German Dachau concentration camp. He was beatified by Pope John Paul II on June 13, 1999, and is a member of the 108 Martyrs of World War II.

== Biography ==
Bargielski was born in Kalinowo to Franciszek and Franciszka Bargielski (née Jankowska). In 1924, he completed schooling from a gymnasium in Łomża, and entered into an officer cadet school in Ostrów Mazowiecka; however, he eventually left the school and entered the diocesan seminary in Łomża on 5 January 1925. He was ordained a priest on 24 February 1929, by Stanisław Kostka Łukomski, and was assigned on 7 March of the same year to serve as vicar of the Church of St. Adalbert in Poznań. He was later sent by Stanisław Łukomski to study law in Strasbourg in October 1929; he studied canon law at the University of Strasbourg between 1929 and 1931. After returning to Poland, he served as a parish priest for various parishes between 1931 and 1939.

In April 1940, Bargielski offered himself to the Gestapo as a substitute for Klemens Sawicki, who had been arrested by the Gestapo. They complied and released Sawicki in exchange for Bargielski, who was transported to Soldau; he was then transferred to Dachau on 19 April 1940, where he received the identification number 4860. From there, he was transferred to Gusen I on 25 May 1940, though he returned to Dachau on 9 December 1940, where he was given an identification number of 22061. Alongside other Polish priests, he was unable to celebrate Mass, pray, recite the breviary or carry religious objects. In spite of this, Bargielski continued to help fellow prisoners.

Bargielski was killed on 8 November 1942, at Dachau by a camp guard — his body was cremated and his ashes scattered in the fields surrounding Dachau. He was beatified by Pope John Paul II on 13 June 1999, in Warsaw.

== See also ==
- List of Nazi-German concentration camps
- The Holocaust in Poland
- World War II casualties of Poland
