= Kalinówka =

Kalinówka may refer to the following places:

- Kalinówka, Lublin County in Lublin Voivodeship (east Poland)
- Kalinówka, Bielsk County in Podlaskie Voivodeship (north-east Poland)
- Kalinówka, Sokółka County in Podlaskie Voivodeship (north-east Poland)
- Kalinówka, Puławy County in Lublin Voivodeship (east Poland)
- Kalinówka, Włodawa County in Lublin Voivodeship (east Poland)
- Kalinówka, Zamość County in Lublin Voivodeship (east Poland)
- Kalinówka, West Pomeranian Voivodeship (north-west Poland)
