= Nowe Krzewo =

The name Nowe Krzewo may refer to:

- Nowe Krzewo, Białystok County - village in Białystok County
- Nowe Krzewo, Łomża County - village in Łomża County
- Nowe Krzewo, Zambrów County - village in Zambrów County
