= Peza =

Peza or PEZA may refer to:

- Philippine Economic Zone Authority, a government agency of the Philippines
- Pęza, a village in Podlaskie Voivodeship, Poland
- Pezë, a former municipality in Tirana County, Albania
- La Peza, a municipality in Granada, Spain

People with the surname Peza include:

- Myslym Peza (1897–1984), Albanian resistance fighter and politician
- Alfred Peza (born 1967), Albanian journalist

== See also ==
- Penza, a city in Penza Oblast, Russia
- Peza Conference, a meeting of Albanian World War II resistance forces in the municipality of Pezë
- Pezza (disambiguation)
- Pyoza, a river in Arghangelsk Oblast, Russia
