= Wypychy =

Wypychy may refer to the following places:

- Wypychy, Masovian Voivodeship (east-central Poland)
- Wypychy, Bielsk County in Podlaskie Voivodeship (north-east Poland)
- Wypychy, Grajewo County in Podlaskie Voivodeship (north-east Poland)
