= Pierzchały =

Pierzchały may refer to the following places:

- Pierzchały, Przasnysz County in Masovian Voivodeship (east-central Poland)
- Pierzchały, Węgrów County in Masovian Voivodeship (east-central Poland)
- Pierzchały, Podlaskie Voivodeship (north-east Poland)
- Pierzchały, Warmian-Masurian Voivodeship (north Poland)
