= Zabawka =

Zabawka may refer to:

- Zabawka, Podlaskie Voivodeship
- Zabawka (film) - a 1933 film
