= Wyrzyki, Podlaskie Voivodeship =

Wyrzyki
- Village
- Location within Poland
- Coordinates: 53°12′01″N 22°11′10″E
- Country: Poland
- Voivodeship: Podlaskie
- County: Łomża
- Gmina: Piątnica
- Population: 102

Wyrzyki [vɨˈʐɨki] is a village in the administrative district of Gmina Piątnica, within Łomża County, Podlaskie Voivodeship, in north-eastern Poland.
