= Falki, Podlaskie Voivodeship =

Falki
- Village
- Location within Poland
- Coordinates: 52°52′N 22°57′E
- Country: Poland
- Voivodeship: Podlaskie
- County: Bielsk
- Gmina: Wyszki

Falki [ˈfalki] is a village in the administrative district of Gmina Wyszki, within Bielsk County, Podlaskie Voivodeship, in north-eastern Poland.

According to the 1921 census, the village was inhabited by 253 people, among whom 242 were Roman Catholic and 11 Mosaic. At the same time, 242 inhabitants declared Polish nationality, 11 Jewish. There were 43 residential buildings in the village.
