= Kisielnica, Podlaskie Voivodeship =

Kisielnica
- Village
- Location within Poland
- Coordinates: 53°16′N 22°7′E
- Country: Poland
- Voivodeship: Podlaskie
- County: Łomża
- Gmina: Piątnica

Kisielnica [kiɕɛlˈnit͡sa] is a village in the administrative district of Gmina Piątnica, within Łomża County, Podlaskie Voivodeship, in north-eastern Poland.
