= Kobylin, Podlaskie Voivodeship =

Kobylin
- Village
- Location within Poland
- Coordinates: 53°18′N 22°9′E
- Country: Poland
- Voivodeship: Podlaskie
- County: Łomża
- Gmina: Piątnica
- Time zone: UTC+1 (CET)
  - Summer (DST): UTC+2 (CEST)
- Vehicle registration: BLM

Kobylin [kɔˈbɨlin] is a village in the administrative district of Gmina Piątnica, within Łomża County, Podlaskie Voivodeship, in north-eastern Poland.

== History ==
As of 1827, the village had a population of 130.

Following the German-Soviet invasion of Poland, which started World War II in September 1939, the village was occupied by the Soviet Union until 1941 and then by Germany until 1944. Polish partisans of the Home Army launched an attack on a German gendarmerie post in Kobylin on 18 March 1943.
