= Łubice =

- Village
- Location within Poland
- Coordinates: 52°51′22″N 22°58′45″E
- Country: Poland
- Voivodeship: Podlaskie
- County: Bielsk
- Gmina: Wyszki
- Population: 50

Łubice [wuˈbit͡sɛ] is a village in the administrative district of Gmina Wyszki, within Bielsk County, Podlaskie Voivodeship, in north-eastern Poland.
