= Niewodowo =

- Village
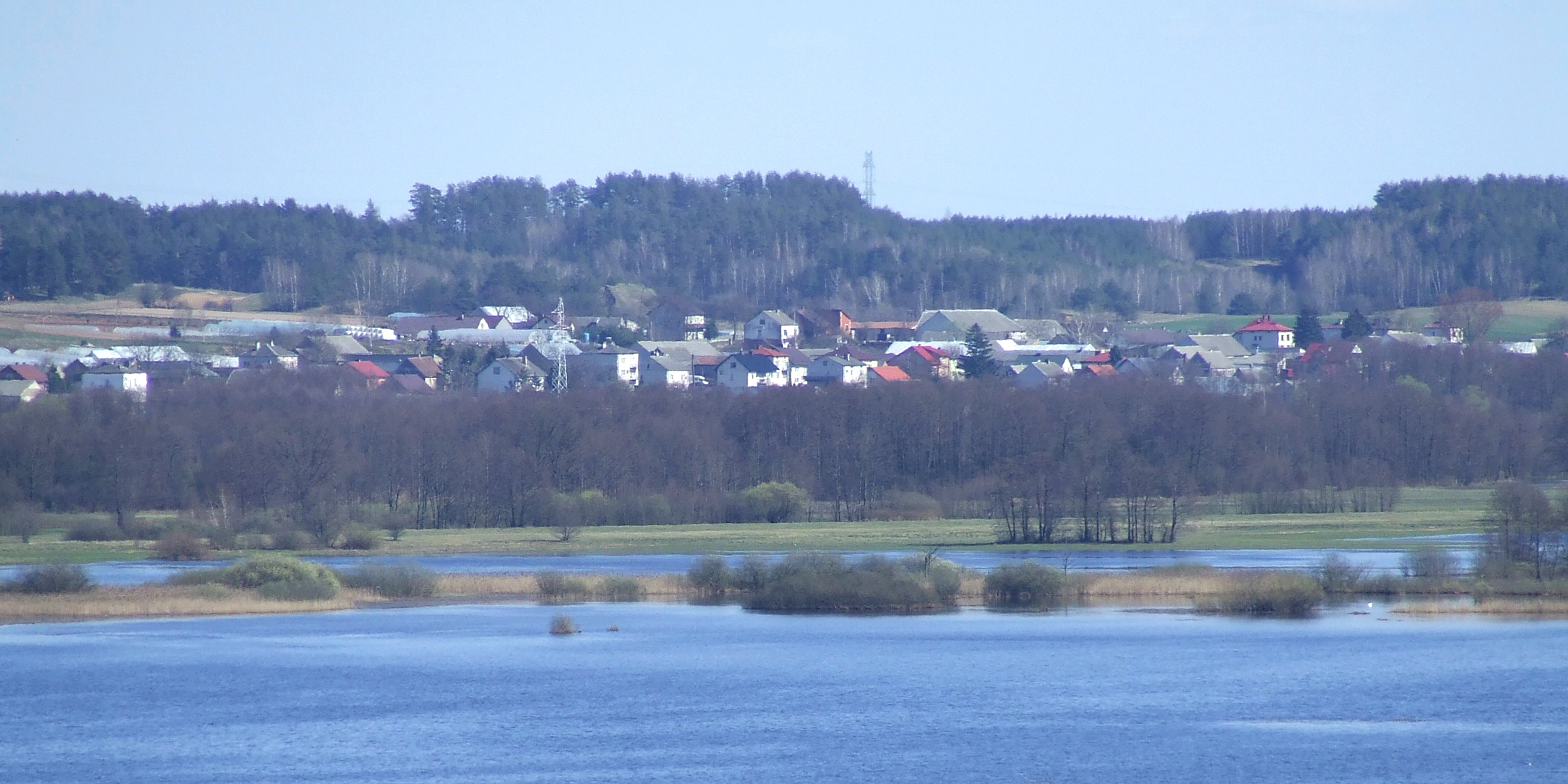

- Location within Poland
- Coordinates: 53°9′N 22°12′E
- Country: Poland
- Voivodeship: Podlaskie
- County: Łomża
- Gmina: Piątnica
- Postal code: 18-421
- Vehicle registration: BLM

Niewodowo [ɲɛvɔˈdɔvɔ] is a village in the administrative district of Gmina Piątnica, within Łomża County, Podlaskie Voivodeship, in north-eastern Poland.

Four Polish citizens were murdered by Nazi Germany in the village during World War II.
