= Olszyny, Podlaskie Voivodeship =

Olszyny
- Village
- Location within Poland
- Coordinates: 53°13′N 22°15′E
- Country: Poland
- Voivodeship: Podlaskie
- County: Łomża
- Gmina: Piątnica

Olszyny [ɔlˈʂɨnɨ] is a village in the administrative district of Gmina Piątnica, within Łomża County, Podlaskie Voivodeship, in north-eastern Poland.
