= Mierzwin Duży =

- Village
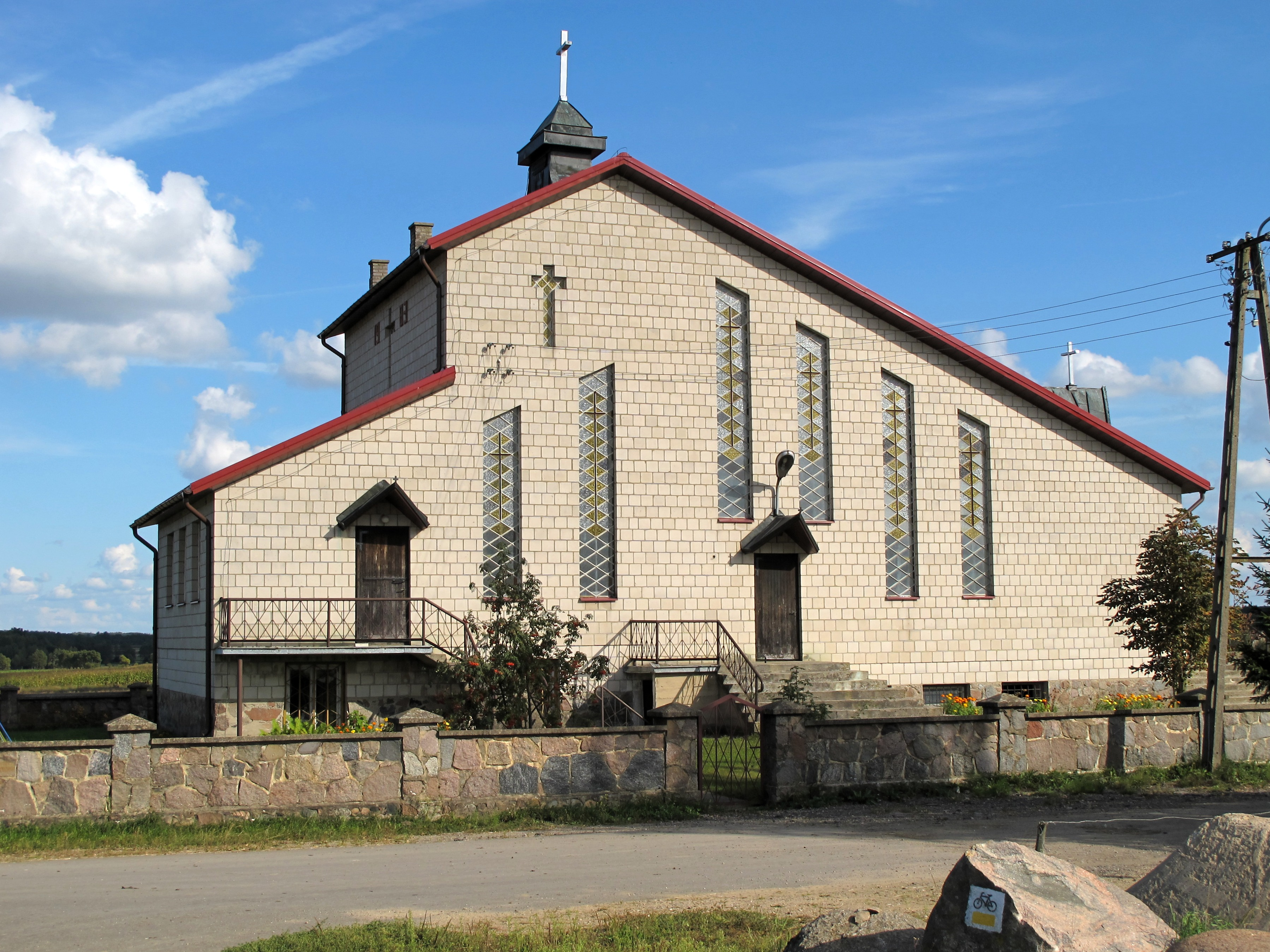
- Ascension of Christ chapel in Mierzwin Duży

- Location within Poland
- Coordinates: 52°48′N 22°56′E
- Country: Poland
- Voivodeship: Podlaskie
- County: Bielsk
- Gmina: Wyszki
- Time zone: UTC+1 (CET)
  - Summer (DST): UTC+2 (CEST)

Mierzwin Duży [ˈmjɛʐvin ˈduʐɨ] is a village in the administrative district of Gmina Wyszki, within Bielsk County, Podlaskie Voivodeship, in north-eastern Poland.

== History ==
Three Polish citizens were murdered by Nazi Germany in the village during World War II.
