= Drożęcin-Lubiejewo =

- Village
- Location within Poland
- Coordinates: 53°15′20″N 22°00′58″E
- Country: Poland
- Voivodeship: Podlaskie
- County: Łomża
- Gmina: Piątnica
- Population: 84

Drożęcin-Lubiejewo [drɔˈʐɛnt͡ɕin lubjɛˈjɛvɔ] is a village in the administrative district of Gmina Piątnica, within Łomża County, Podlaskie Voivodeship, in north-eastern Poland.

The National Census of Population and Housing from 2011 states the official population of the village is 84, with 48.8% of the population being women and 51.2% of the population being male.
