= Piątnica Włościańska =

- Village
- Location within Poland
- Coordinates: 53°10′57″N 22°6′36″E
- Country: Poland
- Voivodeship: Podlaskie
- County: Łomża
- Gmina: Piątnica
- Population: 430

Piątnica Włościańska (Polish pronunciation: [pjɔntˈɲitsa vwɔɕˈtɕaj̃ska]) is a village in the administrative district of Gmina Piątnica, within Łomża County, Podlaskie Voivodeship, in north-eastern Poland.
