= Kownaty-Kolonia, Podlaskie Voivodeship =

Polish village

Kownaty-Kolonia
- Village
- Location within Poland
- Coordinates: 53°15′34″N 22°13′43″E
- Country: Poland
- Voivodeship: Podlaskie
- County: Łomża
- Gmina: Piątnica

Kownaty-Kolonia [kɔvˈnatɨ kɔˈlɔɲa] is a village in the administrative district of Gmina Piątnica, within Łomża County, Podlaskie Voivodeship, in north-eastern Poland.
