= Stary Cydzyn =

- Village
- Location within Poland
- Coordinates: 53°14′37″N 22°7′14″E
- Country: Poland
- Voivodeship: Podlaskie
- County: Łomża
- Gmina: Piątnica

Stary Cydzyn [ˈstarɨ ˈt͡sɨd͡zɨn] is a village in the administrative district of Gmina Piątnica, within Łomża County, Podlaskie Voivodeship, in north-eastern Poland.
