= Samułki Małe =

- Village
- Location within Poland
- Coordinates: 52°53′45″N 23°2′20″E
- Country: Poland
- Voivodeship: Podlaskie
- County: Bielsk
- Gmina: Wyszki

Samułki Małe [saˈmuu̯kʲi ˈmawɛ] is a village in the administrative district of Gmina Wyszki, within Bielsk County, Podlaskie Voivodeship, in north-eastern Poland.
