= Wodźki =

- Village
- Location within Poland
- Coordinates: 52°50′37″N 22°48′02″E
- Country: Poland
- Voivodeship: Podlaskie
- County: Bielsk
- Gmina: Wyszki

Wodźki [ˈvɔt͡ɕki] is a village in the administrative district of Gmina Wyszki, within Bielsk County, Podlaskie Voivodeship, in north-eastern Poland.
