= Szczepany, Podlaskie Voivodeship =

Szczepany
- Village
- Location within Poland
- Coordinates: 52°49′N 22°59′E
- Country: Poland
- Voivodeship: Podlaskie
- County: Bielsk
- Gmina: Wyszki

Szczepany [ʂt͡ʂɛˈpanɨ] is a village in the administrative district of Gmina Wyszki, within Bielsk County, Podlaskie Voivodeship, in north-eastern Poland.
