= Marianowo, Podlaskie Voivodeship =

Marianowo
- Village
- Location within Poland
- Coordinates: 53°12′36″N 22°06′24″E
- Country: Poland
- Voivodeship: Podlaskie
- County: Łomża
- Gmina: Piątnica
- Population: 300

Marianowo [marjaˈnɔvɔ] is a village in the administrative district of Gmina Piątnica, within Łomża County, Podlaskie Voivodeship, in north-eastern Poland.
