= Niewino Kamieńskie =

Village in Gmina Wyszki, Poland

- Village
- Location within Poland
- Coordinates: 52°48′40″N 23°03′03″E
- Country: Poland
- Voivodeship: Podlaskie
- County: Bielsk
- Gmina: Wyszki
- Postal code: 17132

Niewino Kamieńskie [ɲɛˈvinɔ kaˈmjɛɲskʲɛ] is a village in the administrative district of Gmina Wyszki, within Bielsk County, Podlaskie Voivodeship, in north-eastern Poland. According to National Census of Population and Housing (2021), there are 15 inhabitants in the village, 46.7% of whom are women and 53.3% men.

Więcej: https://www.polskawliczbach.pl/wies_Niewino_Kamienskie#dane-demograficzne

Więcej: https://www.polskawliczbach.pl/wies_Niewino_Kamienskie#podstawowe-informacje
