= Stare Zalesie, Bielsk County =

Stare Zalesie
- Village
- Location within Poland
- Coordinates: 52°50′25″N 22°50′37″E
- Country: Poland
- Voivodeship: Podlaskie
- County: Bielsk
- Gmina: Wyszki
- Population: 200

Stare Zalesie [ˈstarɛ zaˈlɛɕɛ] is a village in the administrative district of Gmina Wyszki, within Bielsk County, Podlaskie Voivodeship, in north-eastern Poland.
