= Nowe Bagińskie =

Village in Gmina Wyszki, Poland

- Village
- Location within Poland
- Coordinates: 52°49′44″N 22°56′38″E
- Country: Poland
- Voivodeship: Podlaskie
- County: Bielsk
- Gmina: Wyszki

Nowe Bagińskie [ˈnɔvɛ baˈɡiɲskʲɛ] is a village in the administrative district of Gmina Wyszki, within Bielsk County, Podlaskie Voivodeship, in north-eastern Poland.
