= Malesze =

- Village
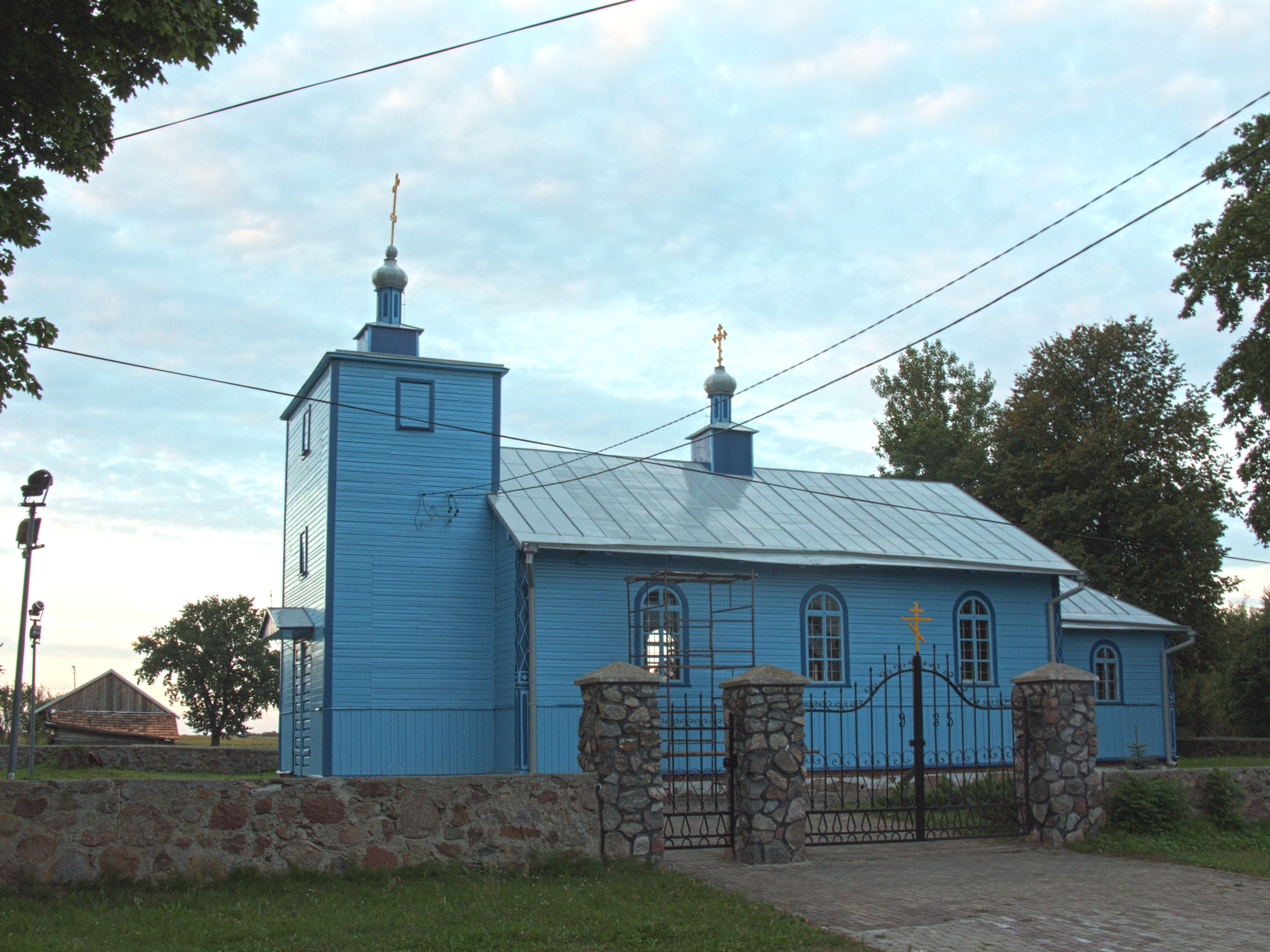

- Location within Poland
- Coordinates: 52°47′38″N 22°57′48″E
- Country: Poland
- Voivodeship: Podlaskie
- County: Bielsk
- Gmina: Wyszki
- Population: 220

Malesze [maˈlɛʂɛ] is a village in the administrative district of Gmina Wyszki, within Bielsk County, Podlaskie Voivodeship, in north-eastern Poland.

According to the 1921 census, the village was inhabited by 285 people, among whom 76 were Roman Catholic, 195 Orthodox, and 14 Mosaic. At the same time, 71 inhabitants declared Polish nationality, 198 Belarusian, 14 Jewish and 2 Russian. There were 53 residential buildings in the village.
