= Zdrojki, Podlaskie Voivodeship =

Zdrojki
- Village
- Location within Poland
- Coordinates: 52°51′40″N 22°57′31″E
- Country: Poland
- Voivodeship: Podlaskie
- County: Bielsk
- Gmina: Wyszki

Zdrojki [ˈzdrɔi̯ki] is a village in the administrative district of Gmina Wyszki, within Bielsk County, Podlaskie Voivodeship, in north-eastern Poland.
