= Górki-Sypniewo =

Village in Gmina Piatnica, Poland

- Village
- Location within Poland
- Coordinates: 53°16′22″N 22°08′09″E
- Country: Poland
- Voivodeship: Podlaskie
- County: Łomża
- Gmina: Piątnica

Górki-Sypniewo [ˈɡurki sɨpˈɲɛvɔ] is a village in the administrative district of Gmina Piątnica, within Łomża County, Podlaskie Voivodeship, in north-eastern Poland.
