= Stare Warpechy =

- Village
- Location within Poland
- Coordinates: 52°51′44″N 23°1′16″E
- Country: Poland
- Voivodeship: Podlaskie
- County: Bielsk
- Gmina: Wyszki
- Population: 160

Stare Warpechy [ˈstarɛ varˈpɛxɨ] is a village in the administrative district of Gmina Wyszki, within Bielsk County, Podlaskie Voivodeship, in north-eastern Poland.

According to the 1921 census, the village was inhabited by 200 people, among whom 196 were Roman Catholic, 2 Orthodox, and 3 Mosaic. At the same time, 196 inhabitants declared Polish nationality, 2 Belarusian and 3 Jewish. There were 39 residential buildings in the village.
