= Mulawicze =

- Village
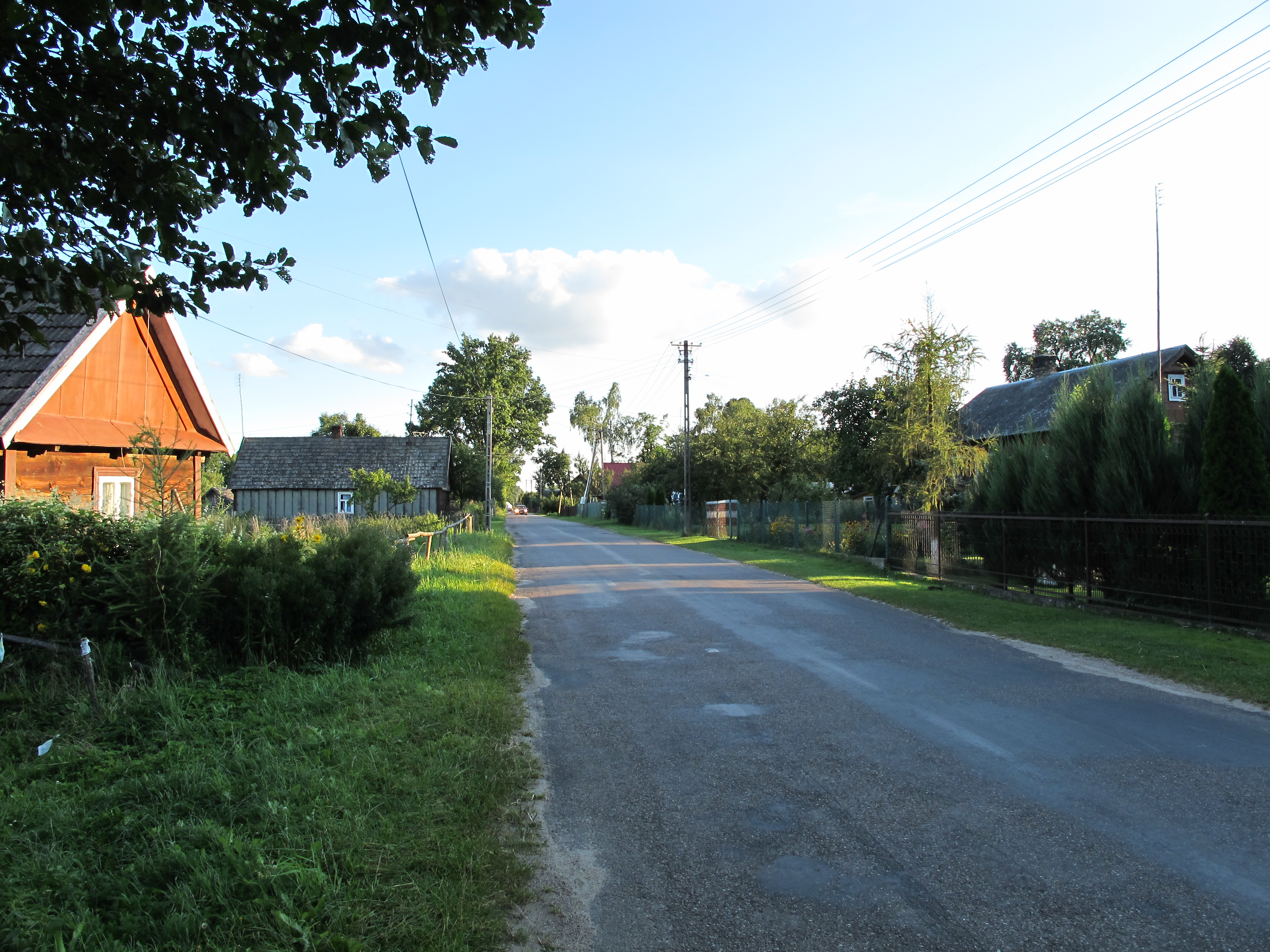

- Location within Poland
- Coordinates: 52°52′N 23°5′E
- Country: Poland
- Voivodeship: Podlaskie
- County: Bielsk
- Gmina: Wyszki

Mulawicze [mulaˈvʲit͡ʂɛ] is a village in the administrative district of Gmina Wyszki, within Bielsk County, Podlaskie Voivodeship, in north-eastern Poland.

According to the 1921 census, the village was inhabited by 301 people, among whom 297 were Roman Catholic and 4 Mosaic. At the same time, 297 inhabitants declared Polish nationality, 4 Jewish. There were 52 residential buildings in the village.
