= Murawy =

- Village
- Location within Poland
- Coordinates: 53°16′N 22°6′E
- Country: Poland
- Voivodeship: Podlaskie
- County: Łomża
- Gmina: Piątnica

Murawy [muˈravɨ] is a village in the administrative district of Gmina Piątnica, within Łomża County, Podlaskie Voivodeship, in north-eastern Poland.
