= Ignatki, Bielsk County =

Ignatki
- Village
- Location within Poland
- Coordinates: 52°52′N 22°55′E
- Country: Poland
- Voivodeship: Podlaskie
- County: Bielsk
- Gmina: Wyszki

Ignatki [iɡˈnatki] is a village in the administrative district of Gmina Wyszki, within Bielsk County, Podlaskie Voivodeship, in north-eastern Poland.
