= Ostrówek, Bielsk County =

Ostrówek
- Village
- Location within Poland
- Coordinates: 52°51′00″N 23°05′54″E
- Country: Poland
- Voivodeship: Podlaskie
- County: Bielsk
- Gmina: Wyszki

Ostrówek [ɔsˈtruvɛk] is a village in the administrative district of Gmina Wyszki, within Bielsk County, Podlaskie Voivodeship, in north-eastern Poland.
