= Piątnica =

Piątnica Poduchowna
- Village
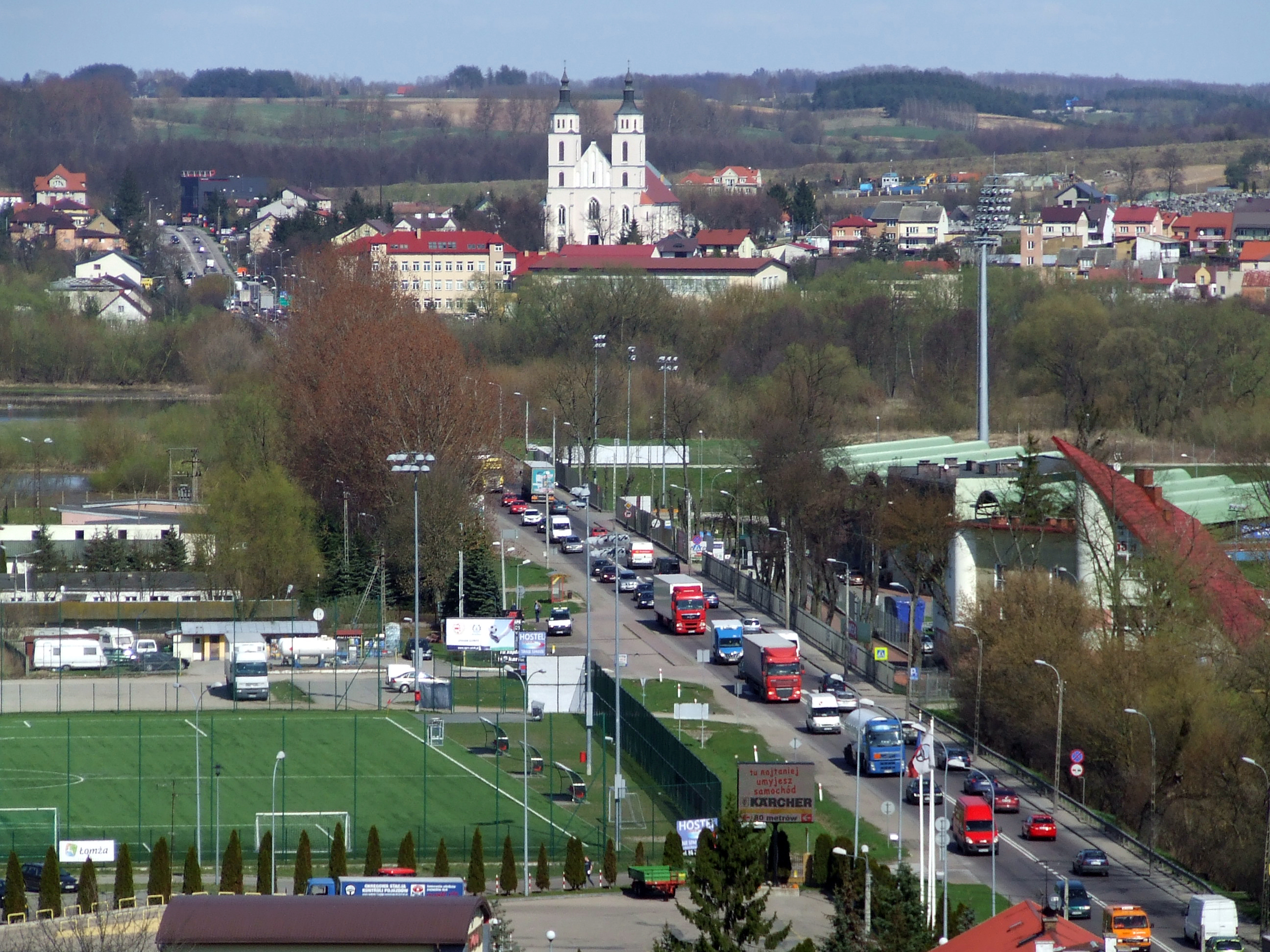
- View of Piątnica from Łomża

- Location within Poland
- Coordinates: 53°11′43″N 22°5′43″E
- Country: Poland
- Voivodeship: Podlaskie
- County: Łomża
- Gmina: Piątnica

Population
  - Total: 1,800 ( 2,006 )
- Time zone: UTC+1 (CET)
  - Summer (DST): UTC+2 (CEST)
- Vehicle registration: BLM

Piątnica Poduchowna (Polish pronunciation: [pjɔntˈɲitsa]; until 1999 Piątnica Poduchowna) is a village in Łomża County, Podlaskie Voivodeship, in north-eastern Poland. It is the seat of gmina (administrative district) called Gmina Piątnica.

== History ==
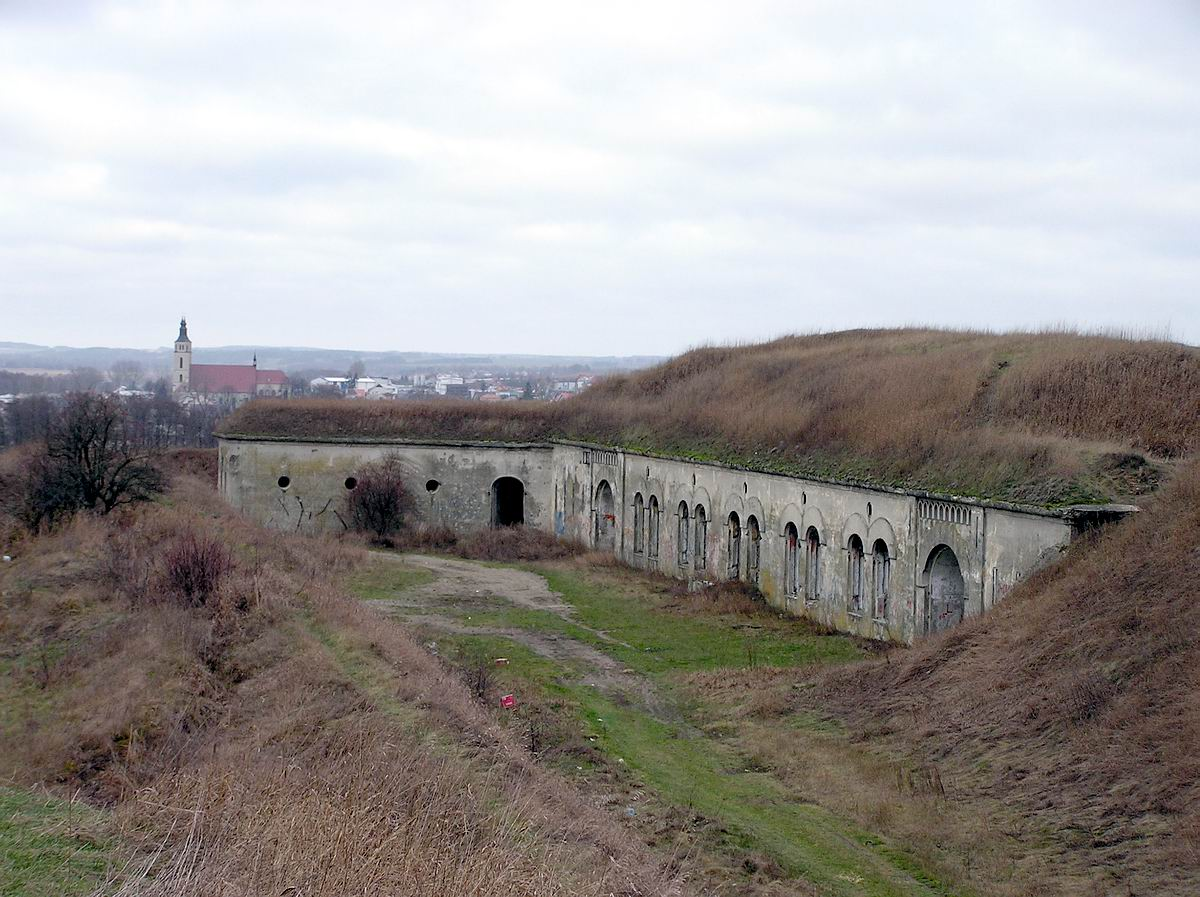
Russian imperial fort in Piątnica, part of 1914 Łomża Fortress in the Russian Partition

Piątnica was founded by Janusz from Zaborowo who built the first church there (1407). The village has also a Neo-Gothic church (1931), which was destroyed during the Second World War and reconstructed after that. There are also Russian forts from the 19th century and from the First World War in its vicinity. During World War II, the forts played a crucial role during the Battle of Łomża. Three Polish citizens were murdered by Nazi Germany in the village during World War II.

== Economy ==
One of Poland's largest dairy cooperatives is based in Piątnica.
