= Kożuszki, Podlaskie Voivodeship =

Kożuszki
- Village
- Location within Poland
- Coordinates: 52°49′N 22°57′E
- Country: Poland
- Voivodeship: Podlaskie
- County: Bielsk
- Gmina: Wyszki

Kożuszki [kɔˈʐuʂki] is a village in the administrative district of Gmina Wyszki, within Bielsk County, Podlaskie Voivodeship, in north-eastern Poland.
