= Wólka Zaleska, Podlaskie Voivodeship =

Wólka Zaleska
- Village
- Location within Poland
- Coordinates: 52°50′N 22°52′E
- Country: Poland
- Voivodeship: Podlaskie
- County: Bielsk
- Gmina: Wyszki
- Time zone: UTC+1 (CET)
  - Summer (DST): UTC+2 (CEST)

Wólka Zaleska [ˈvulka zaˈlɛska] is a village in the administrative district of Gmina Wyszki, within Bielsk County, Podlaskie Voivodeship, in north-eastern Poland.

== History ==
According to the 1921 census, the village was inhabited by 86 people, among whom 81 were Roman Catholic and 5 Jewish. At the same time, 81 inhabitants declared Polish nationality, 5 Jewish. There were 18 residential buildings in the village.

Three Polish citizens were murdered by Nazi Germany in the village during World War II.
