= Kownaty, Podlaskie Voivodeship =

Kownaty
- Village
- Location within Poland
- Coordinates: 53°14′33″N 22°13′31″E
- Country: Poland
- Voivodeship: Podlaskie
- County: Łomża
- Gmina: Piątnica
- Postal code: 18-421
- Vehicle registration: BLM

Kownaty [kɔvˈnatɨ] is a village in the administrative district of Gmina Piątnica, within Łomża County, Podlaskie Voivodeship, in north-eastern Poland.

Four Polish citizens were murdered by Nazi Germany in the village during World War II.
