= Olszyny-Kolonia =

- Village
- Location within Poland
- Coordinates: 53°11′55″N 22°13′28″E
- Country: Poland
- Voivodeship: Podlaskie
- County: Łomża
- Gmina: Piątnica

Olszyny-Kolonia [ɔlˈʂɨnɨ kɔˈlɔɲa] is a village in the administrative district of Gmina Piątnica, within Łomża County, Podlaskie Voivodeship, in northeast Poland.
