= Kałęczyn, Podlaskie Voivodeship =

Kałęczyn
- Village
- Location within Poland
- Coordinates: 53°13′49″N 22°13′58″E
- Country: Poland
- Voivodeship: Podlaskie
- County: Łomża
- Gmina: Piątnica

Kałęczyn [kaˈwɛnt͡ʂɨn] is a village in the administrative district of Gmina Piątnica, within Łomża County, Podlaskie Voivodeship, in north-eastern Poland.
