= Nagórki, Podlaskie Voivodeship =

Nagórki
- Village
- Location within Poland
- Coordinates: 53°15′0″N 22°2′49″E
- Country: Poland
- Voivodeship: Podlaskie
- County: Łomża
- Gmina: Piątnica

Nagórki [naˈɡurki] is a village in the administrative district of Gmina Piątnica, within Łomża County, Podlaskie Voivodeship, in north-eastern Poland.
