= Stary Drożęcin =

- Village
- Location within Poland
- Coordinates: 53°14′36″N 22°03′34″E
- Country: Poland
- Voivodeship: Podlaskie
- County: Łomża
- Gmina: Piątnica

Stary Drożęcin [ˈstarɨ drɔˈʐɛnt͡ɕin] is a village in the administrative district of Gmina Piątnica, within Łomża County, Podlaskie Voivodeship, in north-eastern Poland.
