= Moskwin =

- Village
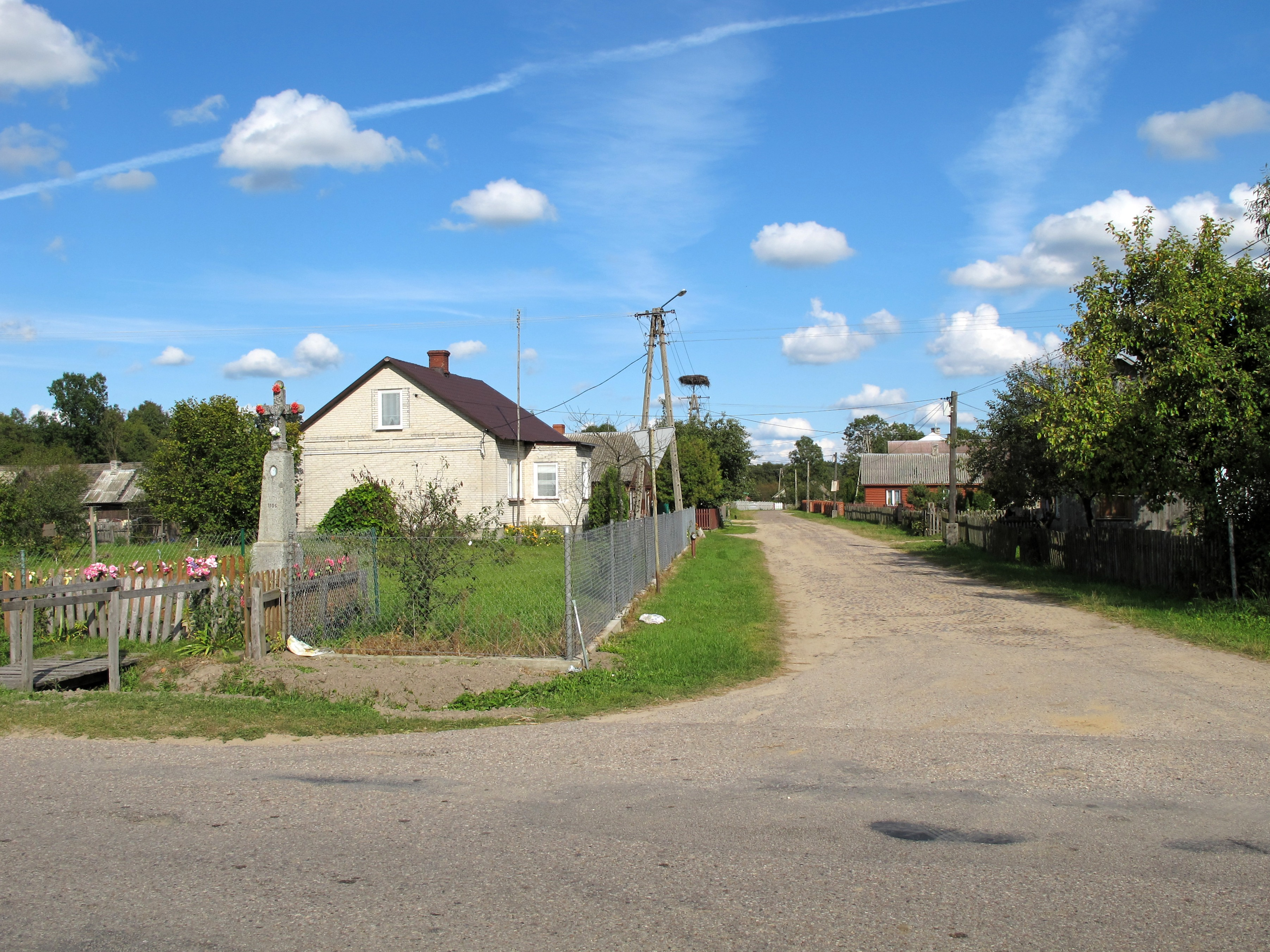

- Location within Poland
- Coordinates: 52°50′N 22°54′E
- Country: Poland
- Voivodeship: Podlaskie
- County: Bielsk
- Gmina: Wyszki
- Time zone: UTC+1 (CET)
  - Summer (DST): UTC+2 (CEST)
- Vehicle registration: BBI

Moskwin [ˈmɔskfin] is a village in the administrative district of Gmina Wyszki, within Bielsk County, Podlaskie Voivodeship, in north-eastern Poland.

== History ==
During the German invasion of Poland at the start of World War II, on September 14, 1939, German troops of the 3rd Panzer Division carried out a massacre of nine local Poles, including one deaf-mute man and one intellectually disabled man (see Nazi crimes against the Polish nation).
