= Górskie, Bielsk County =

Górskie
- Village
- Location within Poland
- Coordinates: 52°50′N 22°55′E
- Country: Poland
- Voivodeship: Podlaskie
- County: Bielsk
- Gmina: Wyszki

Górskie [ˈɡurskʲɛ] is a village in the administrative district of Gmina Wyszki, within Bielsk County, Podlaskie Voivodeship, in north-eastern Poland.
