= Mieszuki =

- Village
- Location within Poland
- Coordinates: 52°50′49″N 23°3′7″E
- Country: Poland
- Voivodeship: Podlaskie
- County: Bielsk
- Gmina: Wyszki

Mieszuki [mjɛˈʂuki] is a village in the administrative district of Gmina Wyszki, within Bielsk County, Podlaskie Voivodeship, in north-eastern Poland.

According to the 1921 census, the village was inhabited by 134 people, among whom 125 were Roman Catholic, 1 Orthodox, and 8 Mosaic. At the same time, 125 inhabitants declared Polish nationality, 1 Belarusian and 8 Jewish. There were 23 residential buildings in the village.
