= Zakrzewo, Bielsk County =

Zakrzewo
- Village
- Location within Poland
- Coordinates: 52°48′38″N 22°59′39″E
- Country: Poland
- Voivodeship: Podlaskie
- County: Bielsk
- Gmina: Wyszki

Zakrzewo [zaˈkʂɛvɔ] is a village in the administrative district of Gmina Wyszki, within Bielsk County, Podlaskie Voivodeship, in north-eastern Poland.
