= Budy-Mikołajka =

Village in Gmina Piątnica, Poland

- Village
- Location within Poland
- Coordinates: 53°15′19″N 22°10′17″E
- Country: Poland
- Voivodeship: Podlaskie
- County: Łomża
- Gmina: Piątnica

Budy-Mikołajka [ˈbudɨ mikɔˈwai̯ka] is a village in the administrative district of Gmina Piątnica, within Łomża County, Podlaskie Voivodeship, in north-eastern Poland.
