= Górki-Szewkowo =

Village in Gmina Piatnica, Poland

- Village
- Location within Poland
- Coordinates: 53°16′11″N 22°09′04″E
- Country: Poland
- Voivodeship: Podlaskie
- County: Łomża
- Gmina: Piątnica

Górki-Szewkowo [ˈɡurki ʂɛfˈkɔvɔ] is a village in the administrative district of Gmina Piątnica, within Łomża County, Podlaskie Voivodeship, in north-eastern Poland.
