= Gmina Piątnica =

Gmina Piątnica Piątnica Commune
- Gmina
- Flag Coat of arms

- Gmina Piątnica within the Łomża County
- Coordinates (Piątnica): 53°11′N 22°6′E
- Country: Poland
- Voivodeship: Podlaskie
- County: Łomża County
- Seat: Piątnica

Area
  - Total: 218.69 km^{2} (84.44 sq mi)

Population (2011)
  - Total: 10,787
  - Density: 49.326/km^{2} (127.75/sq mi)

Gmina Piątnica is a rural gmina (administrative district) in Łomża County, Podlaskie Voivodeship, in north-eastern Poland. Its seat is the village of Piątnica, which lies approximately 3 kilometres (2 mi) north-east of Łomża and 72 km (45 mi) west of the regional capital Białystok.

The gmina covers an area of 218.69 square kilometres (84.4 sq mi), and as of 2006 its total population is 10,642 (10,787 in 2011).

The gmina contains part of the protected area called Łomża Landscape Park.

== Villages ==
Gmina Piątnica contains the villages and settlements of Budy Czarnockie, Budy-Mikołajka, Choszczewo, Czarnocin, Dobrzyjałowo, Drozdowo, Drożęcin-Lubiejewo, Elżbiecin, Gomulnik, Górki-Sypniewo, Górki-Szewkowo, Guty, Jeziorko, Kałęczyn, Kalinowo, Kisielnica, Kobylin, Kosaki, Kownaty, Kownaty-Kolonia, Krzewo, Kurpie, Marianowo, Motyka, Murawy, Nagórki, Niewodowo, Nowe Krzewo, Nowy Cydzyn, Olszyny, Olszyny-Kolonia, Pęza, Piątnica, Piątnica Włościańska, Poniat, Rakowo-Boginie, Rakowo-Czachy, Rządkowo, Stary Cydzyn, Stary Drożęcin, Taraskowo, Truszki, Wiktorzyn, Wyłudzin, Wyrzyki, Zabawka and Żelechy.

== Neighbouring gminas ==
Gmina Piątnica is bordered by the city of Łomża and by the gminas of Jedwabne, Łomża, Mały Płock, Stawiski and Wizna.
