= Pulsze =

- Village
- Location within Poland
- Coordinates: 52°51′N 23°1′E
- Country: Poland
- Voivodeship: Podlaskie
- County: Bielsk
- Gmina: Wyszki

Pulsze [ˈpulʂɛ] is a village in the administrative district of Gmina Wyszki, within Bielsk County, Podlaskie Voivodeship, in north-eastern Poland.

According to the 1921 census, the village was inhabited by 434 people, among whom 398 were Roman Catholic, 6 Orthodox, and 30 Mosaic. At the same time, 406 inhabitants declared Polish nationality, 1 Belarusian and 27 Jewish. There were 77 residential buildings in the village.
