= Krzewo, Podlaskie Voivodeship =

Krzewo
- Village
- Location within Poland
- Coordinates: 53°8′2″N 22°14′52″E
- Country: Poland
- Voivodeship: Podlaskie
- County: Łomża
- Gmina: Piątnica

Krzewo [ˈkʂɛvɔ] is a village in the administrative district of Gmina Piątnica, within Łomża County, Podlaskie Voivodeship, in north-eastern Poland.
