= Łapcie =

- Village
- Location within Poland
- Coordinates: 52°53′N 23°4′E
- Country: Poland
- Voivodeship: Podlaskie
- County: Bielsk
- Gmina: Wyszki

Łapcie [ˈwapt͡ɕɛ] is a village in the administrative district of Gmina Wyszki, within Bielsk County, Podlaskie Voivodeship, in north-eastern Poland.
