= Samułki Duże =

- Village
- Location within Poland
- Coordinates: 52°54′N 23°1′E
- Country: Poland
- Voivodeship: Podlaskie
- County: Bielsk
- Gmina: Wyszki
- Elevation: 79 m (259 ft)
- Population: 152

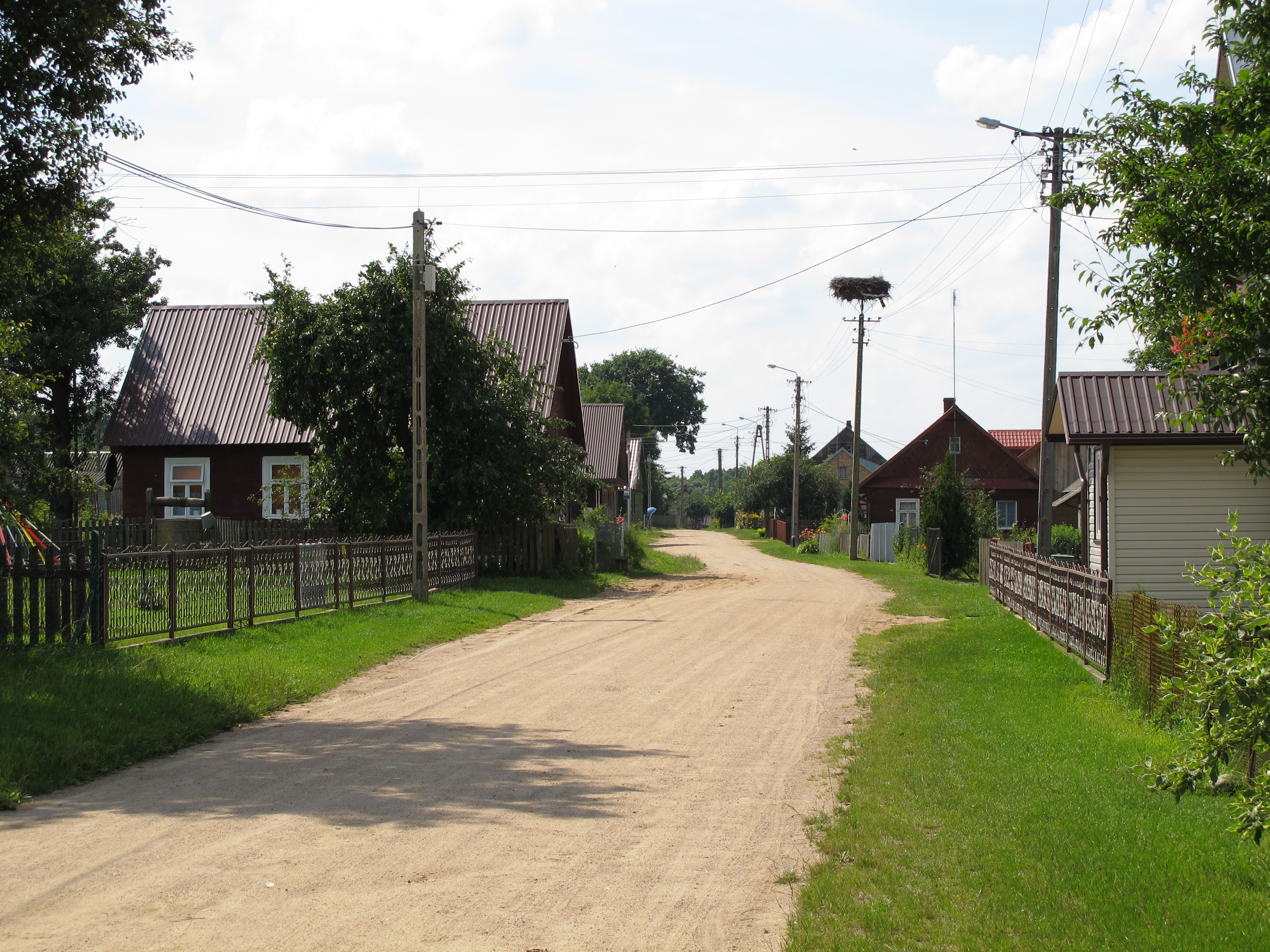
Samułki Duże, Poland

Samułki Duże [saˈmuu̯kʲi ˈduʐɛ] is a village in the administrative district of Gmina Wyszki, within Bielsk County, Podlaskie Voivodeship, in north-eastern Poland.

According to the 1921 census, the village was inhabited by 175 people, among whom 168 were Roman Catholic, 1 Orthodox, and 6 Mosaic. At the same time, 168 inhabitants declared Polish nationality, 1 Belarusian and 6 Jewish. There were 31 residential buildings in the village.
