= Gomulnik =

- Village
- Location within Poland
- Coordinates: 53°11′49″N 22°08′19″E
- Country: Poland
- Voivodeship: Podlaskie
- County: Łomża
- Gmina: Piątnica

Gomulnik [ɡɔˈmulnik] is a village in the administrative district of Gmina Piątnica, within Łomża County, Podlaskie Voivodeship, in north-eastern Poland.
