= Nowe Warpechy =

- Village
- Location within Poland
- Coordinates: 52°50′55″N 23°4′40″E
- Country: Poland
- Voivodeship: Podlaskie
- County: Bielsk
- Gmina: Wyszki
- Population: 110

Nowe Warpechy [ˈnɔvɛ varˈpɛxɨ] is a village in the administrative district of Gmina Wyszki, within Bielsk County, Podlaskie Voivodeship, in north-eastern Poland.
