= Stare Bagińskie =

- Village
- Location within Poland
- Coordinates: 52°49′31″N 22°57′02″E
- Country: Poland
- Voivodeship: Podlaskie
- County: Bielsk
- Gmina: Wyszki

Stare Bagińskie [ˈstarɛ baˈɡiɲskʲɛ] is a village in the administrative district of Gmina Wyszki, within Bielsk County, Podlaskie Voivodeship, in north-eastern Poland.

The villages of Stare Bagińskie and Nowe Baginśkie together made up the Baginski village council.

During the system of voivodeships used between 1975 and 1998, the two were included in the voivodeship of Bialystok.
