= Elżbiecin, Łomża County =

Elżbiecin
- Village
- Location within Poland
- Coordinates: 53°11′48″N 22°8′12″E
- Country: Poland
- Voivodeship: Podlaskie
- County: Łomża
- Gmina: Piątnica

Elżbiecin [ɛlʐˈbjɛt͡ɕin] is a village in the administrative district of Gmina Piątnica, within Łomża County, Podlaskie Voivodeship, in north-eastern Poland.
