= Rządkowo =

Village in Gmina Piątnica, Poland

- Village
- Location within Poland
- Coordinates: 53°13′19″N 22°08′33″E
- Country: Poland
- Voivodeship: Podlaskie
- County: Łomża
- Gmina: Piątnica

Rządkowo [ʐɔntˈkɔvɔ] is a village in the administrative district of Gmina Piątnica, within Łomża County, Podlaskie Voivodeship, in north-eastern Poland.
