= Wólka Pietkowska =

- Village
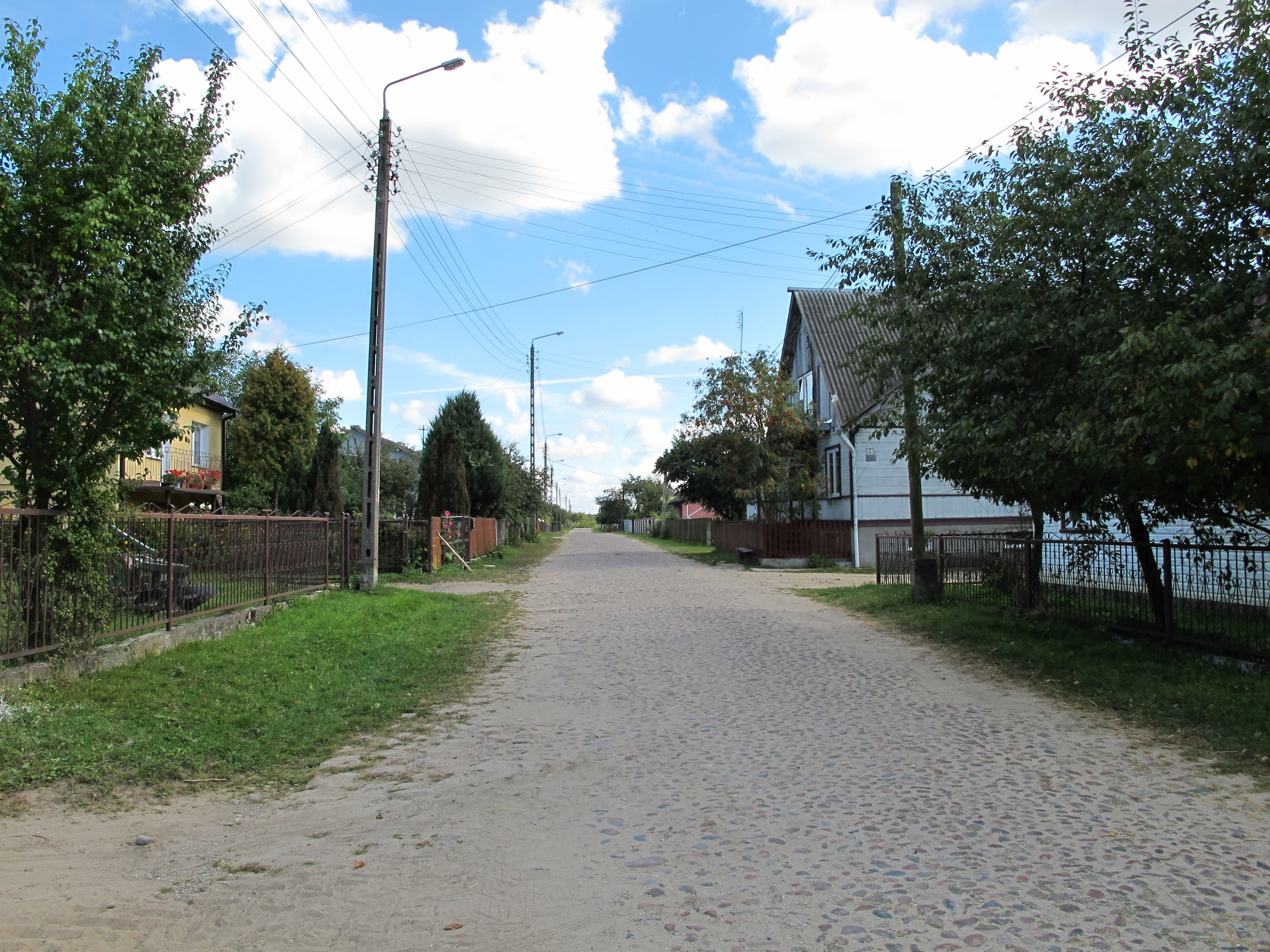

- Location within Poland
- Coordinates: 52°52′N 22°53′E
- Country: Poland
- Voivodeship: Podlaskie
- County: Bielsk
- Gmina: Wyszki

Wólka Pietkowska [ˈvulka pjɛtˈkɔfska] is a village in the administrative district of Gmina Wyszki, within Bielsk County, Podlaskie Voivodeship, in north-eastern Poland.
