= Kosaki =

- Village
- Location within Poland
- Coordinates: 53°09′21″N 22°15′56″E
- Country: Poland
- Voivodeship: Podlaskie
- County: Łomża
- Gmina: Piątnica
- Population: 280

Kosaki [kɔˈsaki] is a village in the administrative district of Gmina Piątnica, within Łomża County, Podlaskie Voivodeship, in north-eastern Poland.
