= Budlewo =

- Village
- Location within Poland
- Coordinates: 52°51′N 22°56′E
- Country: Poland
- Voivodeship: Podlaskie
- County: Bielsk
- Gmina: Wyszki

Budlewo [buˈdlɛvɔ] is a village in the administrative district of Gmina Wyszki, within Bielsk County, Podlaskie Voivodeship, in north-eastern Poland.
