= Żelechy, Podlaskie Voivodeship =

Żelechy
- Village
- Location within Poland
- Coordinates: 53°10′45″N 22°14′46″E
- Country: Poland
- Voivodeship: Podlaskie
- County: Łomża
- Gmina: Piątnica

Żelechy [ʐɛˈlɛxɨ] is a village in the administrative district of Gmina Piątnica, within Łomża County, Podlaskie Voivodeship, in north-eastern Poland.
