= Kurpie, Podlaskie Voivodeship =

Kurpie
- Village
- Location within Poland
- Coordinates: 53°10′33″N 22°10′16″E
- Country: Poland
- Voivodeship: Podlaskie
- County: Łomża
- Gmina: Piątnica

Kurpie [ˈkurpjɛ] is a village in the administrative district of Gmina Piątnica, within Łomża County, Podlaskie Voivodeship, in north-eastern Poland.
