= Filipy, Podlaskie Voivodeship =

Filipy
- Village
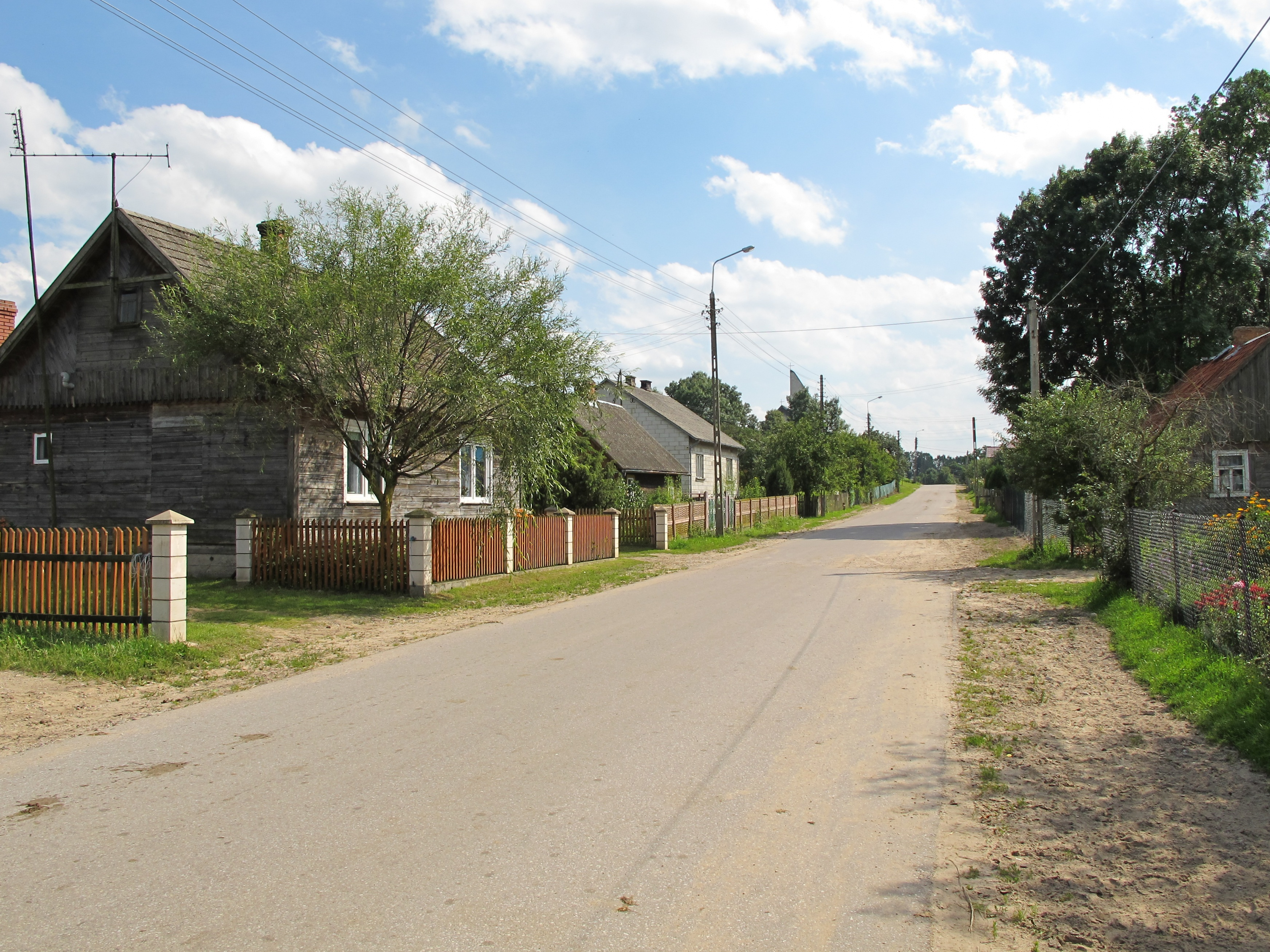

- Location within Poland
- Coordinates: 52°54′N 22°59′E
- Country: Poland
- Voivodeship: Podlaskie
- County: Bielsk
- Gmina: Wyszki

Filipy (Polish pronunciation: [fiˈlipɨ]) is a village in the administrative district of Gmina Wyszki, within Bielsk County, Podlaskie Voivodeship, in north-eastern Poland.
