= Koćmiery =

- Village
- Location within Poland
- Coordinates: 52°51′14″N 22°56′56″E
- Country: Poland
- Voivodeship: Podlaskie
- County: Bielsk
- Gmina: Wyszki
- Population: 50

Koćmiery [kɔt͡ɕˈmjɛrɨ] is a village in the administrative district of Gmina Wyszki, within Bielsk County, Podlaskie Voivodeship, in north-eastern Poland.
