= Stare Niewino =

- Village
- Location within Poland
- Coordinates: 52°48′56″N 23°3′40″E
- Country: Poland
- Voivodeship: Podlaskie
- County: Bielsk
- Gmina: Wyszki
- Population: 60

Stare Niewino [ˈstarɛ ɲɛˈvinɔ] is a village in the administrative district of Gmina Wyszki, within Bielsk County, Podlaskie Voivodeship, in north-eastern Poland.
