= Kamienny Dwór =

- Village
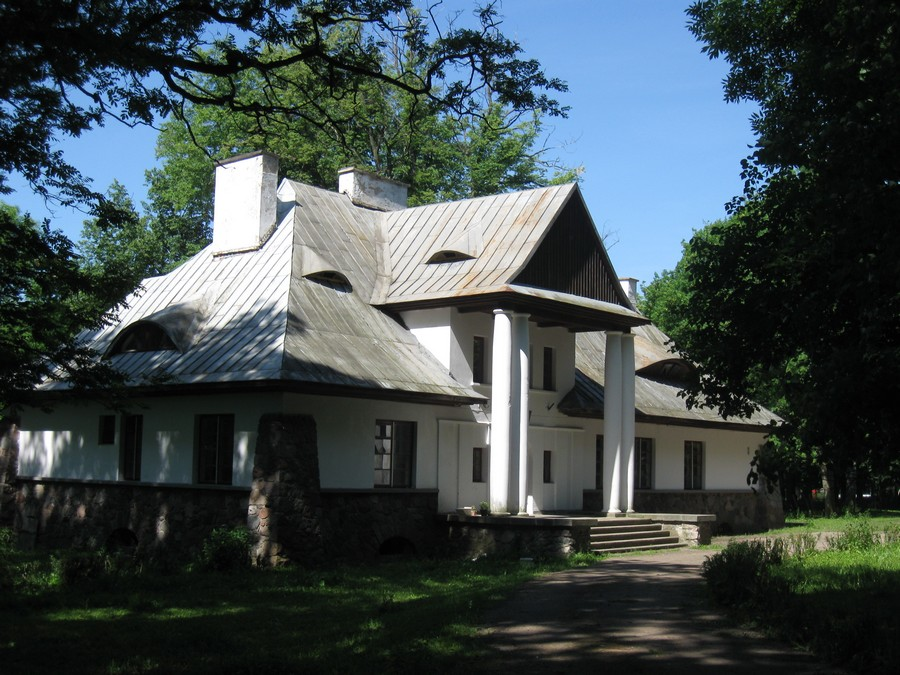

- Location within Poland
- Coordinates: 52°52′10″N 22°53′10″E
- Country: Poland
- Voivodeship: Podlaskie
- County: Bielsk
- Gmina: Wyszki
- Population: 220

Kamienny Dwór [kaˈmjɛnnɨ ˈdvur] is a village in the administrative district of Gmina Wyszki, within Bielsk County, Podlaskie Voivodeship, in north-eastern Poland.
