= Poniat, Podlaskie Voivodeship =

Poniat
- Village
- Location within Poland
- Coordinates: 53°14′N 22°12′E
- Country: Poland
- Voivodeship: Podlaskie
- County: Łomża
- Gmina: Piątnica

Poniat [ˈpɔɲat] is a village in the administrative district of Gmina Piątnica, within Łomża County, Podlaskie Voivodeship, in north-eastern Poland.
