= Wyszki, Podlaskie Voivodeship =

Wyszki
- Village
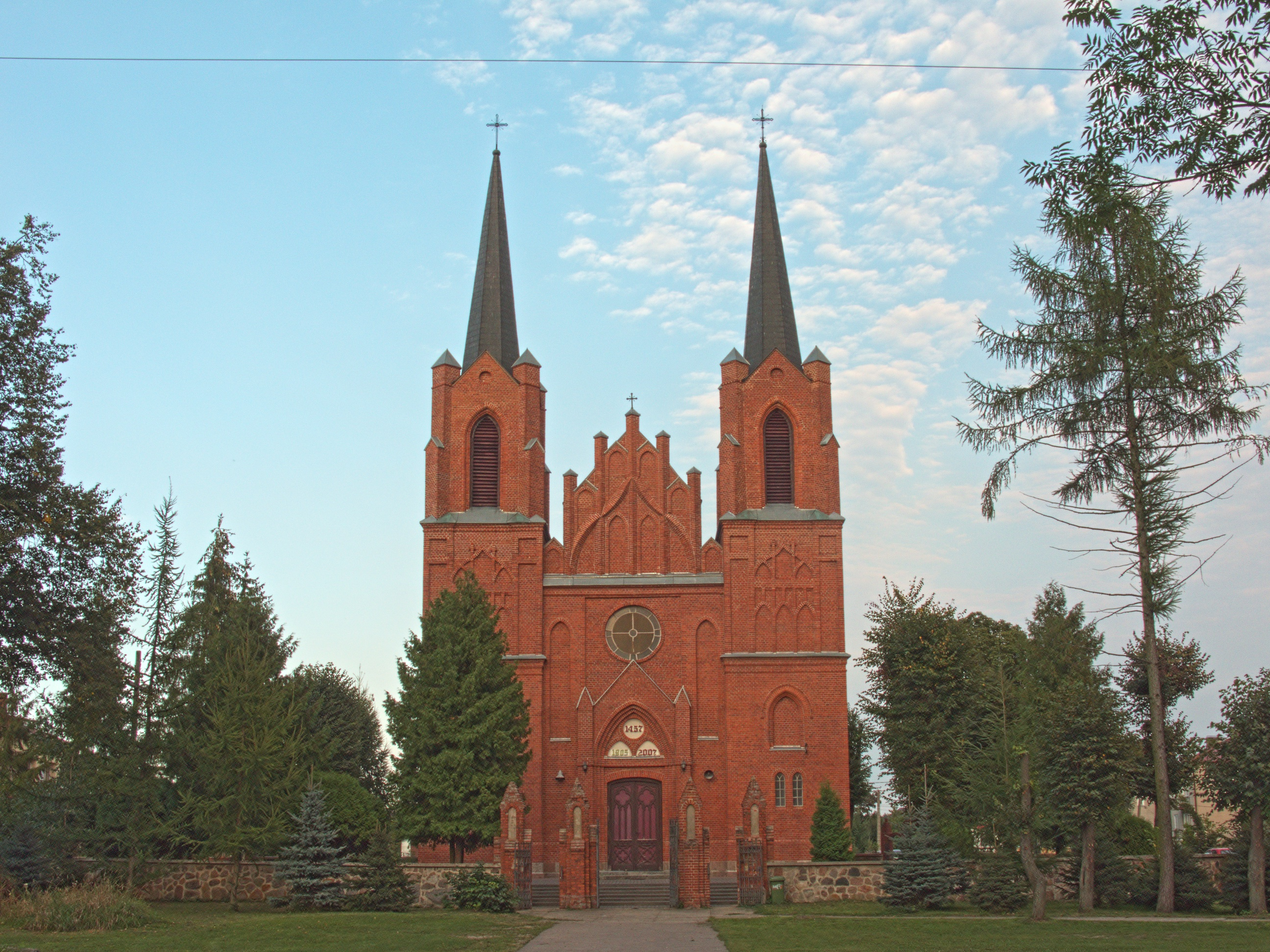
- Church of Saint Andrew

- Location within Poland
- Coordinates: 52°51′N 22°59′E
- Country: Poland
- Voivodeship: Podlaskie
- County: Bielsk
- Gmina: Wyszki
- Postal code: 17-132
- Vehicle registration: BBI

Wyszki [ˈvɨʂki] is a village in Bielsk County, Podlaskie Voivodeship, in north-eastern Poland. It is the seat of the gmina (administrative district) called Gmina Wyszki.

Four Polish citizens were murdered by Nazi Germany in the village during World War II.
