= Nowe Krzewo, Łomża County =

Village in Gmina Piątnica, Poland

Nowe Krzewo
- Village
- Location within Poland
- Coordinates: 53°08′48″N 22°14′09″E
- Country: Poland
- Voivodeship: Podlaskie
- County: Łomża
- Gmina: Piątnica

Nowe Krzewo [ˈnɔvɛ ˈkʂɛvɔ] is a village in the administrative district of Gmina Piątnica, within Łomża County, Podlaskie Voivodeship, in north-eastern Poland.
