= Kalinowo, Łomża County =

Kalinowo
- Village
- Location within Poland
- Coordinates: 53°11′N 22°8′E
- Country: Poland
- Voivodeship: Podlaskie
- County: Łomża
- Gmina: Piątnica
- Time zone: UTC+1 (CET)
  - Summer (DST): UTC+2 (CEST)

Kalinowo [kaliˈnɔvɔ] is a village in the administrative district of Gmina Piątnica, within Łomża County, Podlaskie Voivodeship, in north-eastern Poland.

== History ==
Three Polish citizens were murdered by Nazi Germany in the village during World War II.
