= Zabawka, Podlaskie Voivodeship =

Zabawka
- Village
- Location within Poland
- Coordinates: 53°12′2″N 22°9′19″E
- Country: Poland
- Voivodeship: Podlaskie
- County: Łomża
- Gmina: Piątnica

Zabawka [zaˈbafka] is a village in the administrative district of Gmina Piątnica, within Łomża County, Podlaskie Voivodeship, in north-eastern Poland.
