= Gmina Wyszki =

Gmina Wyszki Wyszki Commune
- Gmina
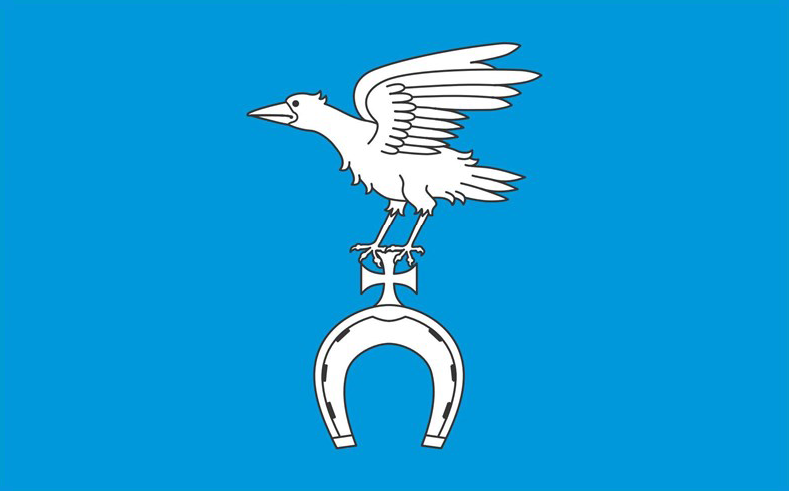
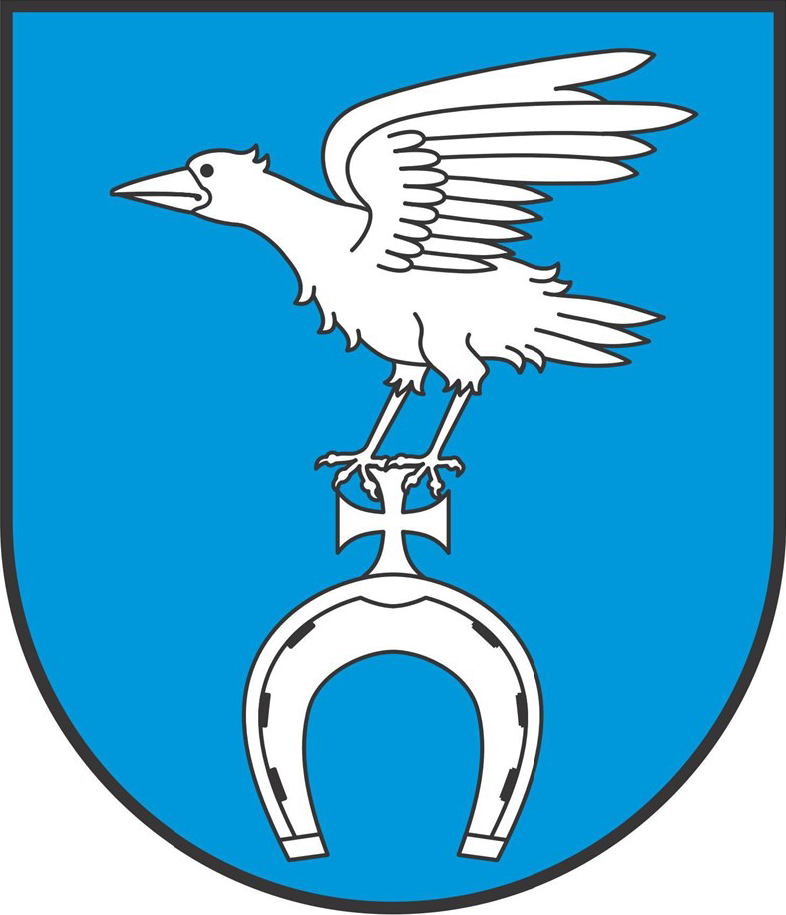
- Flag Coat of arms

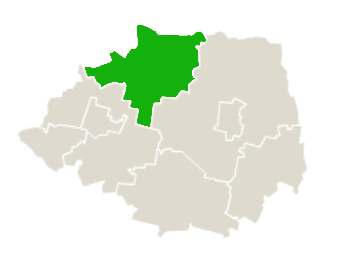
- Gmina Wyszki within Bielsk County

- Location within Poland
- Coordinates: 52°50′26.27″N 22°58′29.6″E
- Country: Poland
- Voivodeship: Podlaskie
- County: Bielsk
- Seat: Wyszki

Government
  - Mayor: Mariusz Korzeniewski

Area
  - Total: 206.5 km^{2} (79.7 sq mi)

Population (2007)
  - Total: 4,914
  - Density: 23.80/km^{2} (61.63/sq mi)
- Time zone: UTC+1 (CET)
  - Summer (DST): UTC+2 (CEST)
- Postal code: 17-132
- Area code: +48 085
- Car plates: BBI
- Website: http://www.wyszki.pl/

Gmina Wyszki [ˈvɨʂki] is a rural gmina (Polish:gmina wiejska) in Bielsk County, Podlaskie Voivodeship. It is located in north-eastern Poland.

== Geography ==
Brańsk is located in the geographical region of Europe known as the Wysoczyzny Podlasko – Bialoruskie (English: Podlaskie and Belarus Plateau) and the mezoregion known as the Równina Bielska (Bielska Plain).

The gmina covers an area of 206.5 square kilometres (79.7 sq mi).

=== Location ===
It is located approximately:

- 160 kilometres (99.4 mi) northeast of Warsaw, the capital of Poland
- 52 kilometres (32.3 mi) southwest of Białystok, the capital of the Podlaskie Voivodeship
- 18 kilometres (11.2 mi) northwest of Bielsk Podlaski, the seat of Bielsk County

=== Climate ===
The region has a continental climate which is characterized by high temperatures during summer and long and frosty winters . The average amount of rainfall during the year exceeds 550 millimetres (21.7 in).

== Demographics ==
Detailed data as of 31 December 2007:

| | Total | | Women | | Men | |
|---|---|---|---|---|---|---|
| Unit | Number | % | Number | % | Number | % |
| Population | 4,914 | 100 | 2,440 | 49.7 | 2,474 | 50.3 |
| Population Density (persons/km²) | 23.8 | | 11.8 | | 12.0 | |

== Municipal government ==
Its seat is the village of Wyszki.

=== Executive branch ===
The chief executive of the government is the Mayor (Polish: Wójt).

=== Legislative branch ===
The legislative portion of the government is the City Council (Polish: Rada) composed of the President (Polish: Przewodniczący), the Vice-President (Polish: Wiceprzewodniczący) and thirteen councilors.

=== Villages ===
The following villages are contained within the gmina:

Bogusze, Budlewo, Bujnowo, Falki, Filipy, Gawiny, Godzieby, Górskie, Ignatki, Kalinówka, Kamienny Dwór, Koćmiery, Kowale, Kożuszki, Krupice, Łapcie, Łubice, Łuczaje, Łyse, Malesze, Mierzwin Duży, Mierzwin Mały, Mieszuki, Moskwin, Mulawicze, Niewino Borowe, Niewino Kamieńskie, Niewino Leśne, Niewino Popławskie, Nowe Bagińskie, Nowe Warpechy, Olszanica, Osówka, Ostrówek, Pierzchały, Pulsze, Samułki Duże, Samułki Małe, Sasiny, Sieśki, Stacewicze, Stare Bagińskie, Stare Niewino, Stare Warpechy, Stare Zalesie, Strabla, Szczepany, Szpaki, Topczewo, Trzeszczkowo, Tworki, Wiktorzyn, Wodźki, Wólka Pietkowska, Wólka Zaleska, Wypychy, Wyszki, Zakrzewo, Zdrojki.

=== Neighbouring political subdivisions ===
Gmina Wyszki is bordered by the gminas of Bielsk Podlaski, Brańsk, Juchnowiec Kościelny, Poświętne and Suraż.
