= Pęza =

- Village
- Location within Poland
- Coordinates: 53°14′N 22°4′E
- Country: Poland
- Voivodeship: Podlaskie
- County: Łomża
- Gmina: Piątnica

Pęza ([ˈpɛ̃za]) is a village in the administrative district of Gmina Piątnica, within Łomża County, Podlaskie Voivodeship, in north-eastern Poland.
