= Wiktorzyn, Łomża County =

Wiktorzyn
- Village
- Location within Poland
- Coordinates: 53°11′25″N 22°12′55″E
- Country: Poland
- Voivodeship: Podlaskie
- County: Łomża
- Gmina: Piątnica

Wiktorzyn [vikˈtɔʐɨn] is a village in the administrative district of Gmina Piątnica, within Łomża County, Podlaskie Voivodeship, in north-eastern Poland.
