= Pierzchały, Podlaskie Voivodeship =

Village in Gmina Wyszki, Poland

Pierzchały
- Village
- Location within Poland
- Coordinates: 52°49′19″N 22°56′23″E
- Country: Poland
- Voivodeship: Podlaskie
- County: Bielsk
- Gmina: Wyszki

Pierzchały [pjɛʂˈxawɨ] is a village located in the administrative district of Gmina Wyszki, within Bielsk County, in the Podlaskie Voivodeship, of north-eastern Poland.
