= 2011 census =

2011 censuses were conducted in the following countries:

- Australia: Census in Australia
- Austria: Demographics of Austria
- Bangladesh: 2011 Bangladeshi census
- Bulgaria: Demographics of Bulgaria
- Canada: 2011 Canadian Census
- Croatia: 2011 Census of Croatia
- Czech Republic: 2011 Czech census
- Estonia: 2011 Estonian census
- European Union: 2011 European Union census
- Faroe Island: 2011 Faroe Island census
- Germany: 2011 German census
- Greece: 2011 Greek census
- India: 2011 Indian census
- Ireland: 2011 census of Ireland
- Italy: 2011 Italian Census
- Kosovo: 2011 Census of Kosovo
- Latvia: Demographics of Latvia
- Montenegro: 2011 Census of Montenegro
- Namibia: Demographics of Namibia
- Nepal: Demographics of Nepal
- New Zealand: 2011 New Zealand census
- Poland: 2011 Polish census
- Portugal: Demographics of Portugal
- Romania: 2011 Romanian census
- Slovakia: Demographics of Slovakia
- South Africa: 2011 South African census
- Sri Lanka: 2011 Sri Lankan Census
- Ukraine: 2011 Ukrainian Census
- United Kingdom: 2011 United Kingdom census
