= Ethnic minorities in Poland =

After centuries of relative ethnic diversity, the population of modern Poland has become nearly completely ethnically homogeneous Polish as a result of altered borders and the Nazi German and Soviet or Polish Communist population transfers, expulsions and deportations (from or to Poland) during and after World War II. Ethnic minorities remain in Poland, however, including some newly arrived or increased in number. Ethnic groups include Germans, Ukrainians and Belarusians.

== Historic ==
=== Kingdom of Poland and the Polish–Lithuanian Commonwealth ===
Although the concept of an ethnic minority is mostly used about a modern period, Poland has historically been a multi-ethnic country. The early influx of Czechs, Hungarians, Slovaks, and Germans was particularly notable, and they formed significant minorities (or majorities) in urban centers. Walloons migrated to Poland probably since the 12th century, however, the first written mention of Walloon immigrants in Wrocław comes from c. 1270. Armenians and Scots, who formed notable communities, lived in Poland since the 14th century. After the late-14th-century Polish–Lithuanian union and the Union of Lublin, which established the Polish–Lithuanian Commonwealth in 1569, Lithuanians and Ruthenians became part of the population.

A 1493 estimate listed the combined population of Poland and Lithuania at 7.5 million, broken down by ethnicity:

- 3.25 million Poles
- 3.75 million Ruthenians (present-day Ukrainians, Belarusians, and Rusyns)
- 0.5 million Lithuanians

In 1618, after the Truce of Deulino, the Commonwealth's territory increased and its population reached 12 million. Its inhabitants could be roughly divided into:

- Poles – 4.5 million
- Ukrainians – 3.5 million
- Belarusians – 1.5 million
- Lithuanians – 0.75 million
- Prussians – 0.75 million
- Jews – 0.5 million
- Livonians – 0.5 million

At that time, the szlachta (nobility) were 10 percent of the population and the burghers 15 percent.

With the population and territorial losses of the mid- and late 17th century, the 1717 population of the Commonwealth had declined to nine million in the following ethnic groups:

- 4.5 million Poles
- 1.5 million Ukrainians
- 1.2 million Belarusians
- 0.8 million Lithuanians
- 0.5 million Jews
- 0.5 million others

=== Second Polish Republic ===
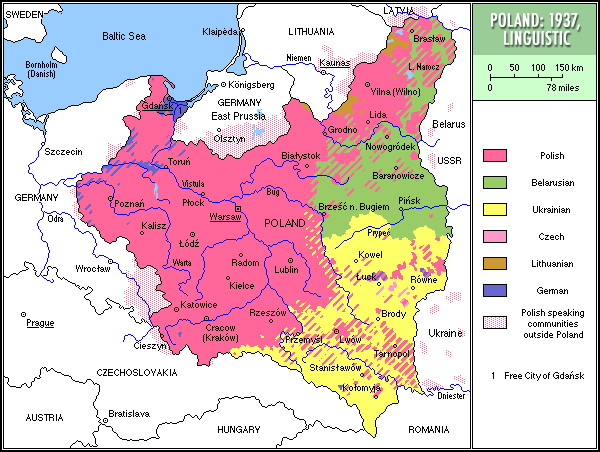
1937 linguistic map of Poland

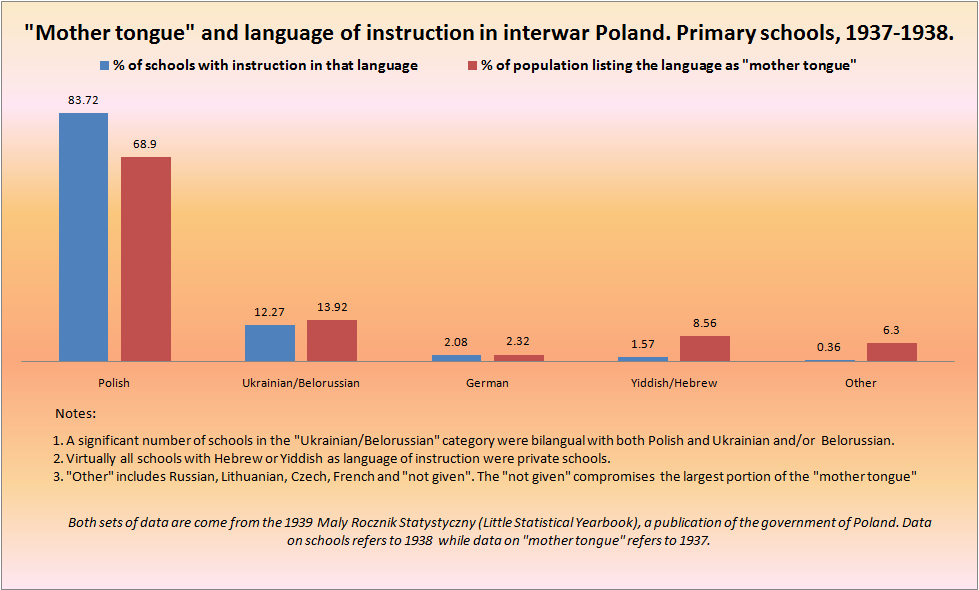
Languages of instruction in interwar Polish schools and ethnic "mother tongues", 1937–38

According to the 1921 Polish census, 30.8 percent of the population were ethnic minorities. This increased due to the Polish victory in the Polish-Soviet War and the large territorial gains in the east as a consequence. According to the 1931 Polish census (as cited by Norman Davies), 68.9 percent of the population was Polish, 13.9 percent were Ukrainians, about 10 percent Jewish, 3.1 percent Belarusians, 2.3 percent Germans and 2.8 percent other groups (including Lithuanians, Czechs and Armenians). There were also smaller communities of Russians and Romani people. The minority situation was complex and fluid during the period.

Poland was also a nation of many religions. In 1921, 16,057,229 Poles (about 62.5 percent) were Roman Catholics, 3,031,057 (about 11.8 percent) were Eastern Rite Catholics (primarily Ukrainian Greek and Armenian Rite Catholics), 2,815,817 (about 10.95 percent) were Greek Orthodox, 2,771,949 (about 10.8 percent) were Jewish, and 940,232 (about 3.7 percent) were Protestants (mostly Lutherans). Poland had the world's second-largest Jewish population by 1931: one-fifth, about 3,136,000.

== People's Republic and Third Republic ==
=== Polish People's Republic ===
Before World War II, one-third of Poland's population belonged to ethnic minority groups. Poland's minorities were mostly gone after the war, however, due to the 1945 revision of borders and the Holocaust. Under the National Repatriation Office (Państwowy Urząd Repatriacyjny), millions of Poles were forced to leave their homes in the eastern Kresy region and settle in territories regained from Germany in the west. About five million remaining Germans (about eight million had already fled or been expelled, and about one million had been killed between 1944 and 1946) were similarly expelled from those territories to Allied-occupied Germany in accordance with the Potsdam Agreement. Ukrainian and Belarusian minorities found themselves now mostly within the borders of the Soviet Union; those who opposed this new policy (like the Ukrainian Insurgent Army in the Bieszczady Mountains region) were suppressed by the end of 1947 in Operation Vistula.

The Jewish population of Poland, the largest Jewish community in pre-war Europe at about 3.3 million people, was almost completely destroyed by 1945. Approximately three million Jews died of starvation in ghettos and labor camps, or were slaughtered in Nazi extermination camps or by Einsatzgruppen death squads. Between 40,000 and 100,000 Polish Jews survived the Holocaust in Poland, another 50,000 to 170,000 were repatriated from the Soviet Union, and 20,000 to 40,000 came from Germany and other countries. There were 180,000 to 240,000 Jews in Poland at the country's postwar peak, settled mainly in Warsaw, Łódź, Kraków and Wrocław.

=== Third Polish Republic rights ===
The rights of ethnic minorities in Poland are guaranteed in article 35 of the 1997 Constitution:

1. The Republic of Poland shall ensure Polish citizens belonging to national or ethnic minorities the freedom to maintain and develop their own language, to maintain customs and traditions, and to develop their own culture.
2. National and ethnic minorities shall have the right to establish educational and cultural institutions, institutions designed to protect religious identity, as well as to participate in the resolution of matters connected with their cultural identity.

The Act on Ethnic and National Minorities and on the Regional Language of 6 January 2005 (Polish: Ustawa o mniejszościach narodowych i etnicznych oraz o języku regionalnym) stipulates that to be recognized as an ethnic or national minority, a group must reside in Poland for at least 100 years; this excludes minorities recognized by the Communist regime, such as the Greeks. There are three categories of recognized minorities in Poland: nine national minorities (Belarusians, Czechs, Lithuanians, Germans, Armenians, Russians, Slovaks, Ukrainians and Jews), four ethnic minorities (Karaites, Lemkos, Roma and Tatars), and the regional Kashubian linguistic minority.

Poland ratified the European Charter for Regional or Minority Languages on 12 February 2009:

1. Minority languages: Belarusian, Czech, Hebrew, Yiddish, Karaim, Kashubian, Lithuanian, the Lemko dialects, German, Armenian, Romani, Russian, Slovak, Tatar and Ukrainian
2. Regional language: Kashubian
3. National-minorities languages: Belarusian, Czech, Hebrew, Yiddish, Lithuanian, German, Armenian, Russian, Slovak and Ukrainian
4. Ethnic-minority languages: Karaim, Lemko, Romani and Tatar
5. Non-territorial languages: Hebrew, Yiddish, Karaim, Armenian and Romani

Minorities have a number of rights, including street signs and education in their native language, cultural development and non-assimilation. In municipalities (gminy) where they constitute more than 20 percent of the population, they have the right to official communications in their native language. Such municipalities must be included on the official register of municipalities where an additional language is used, and incentives exist for officials of these municipalities to learn the regional language.

== Demographics ==
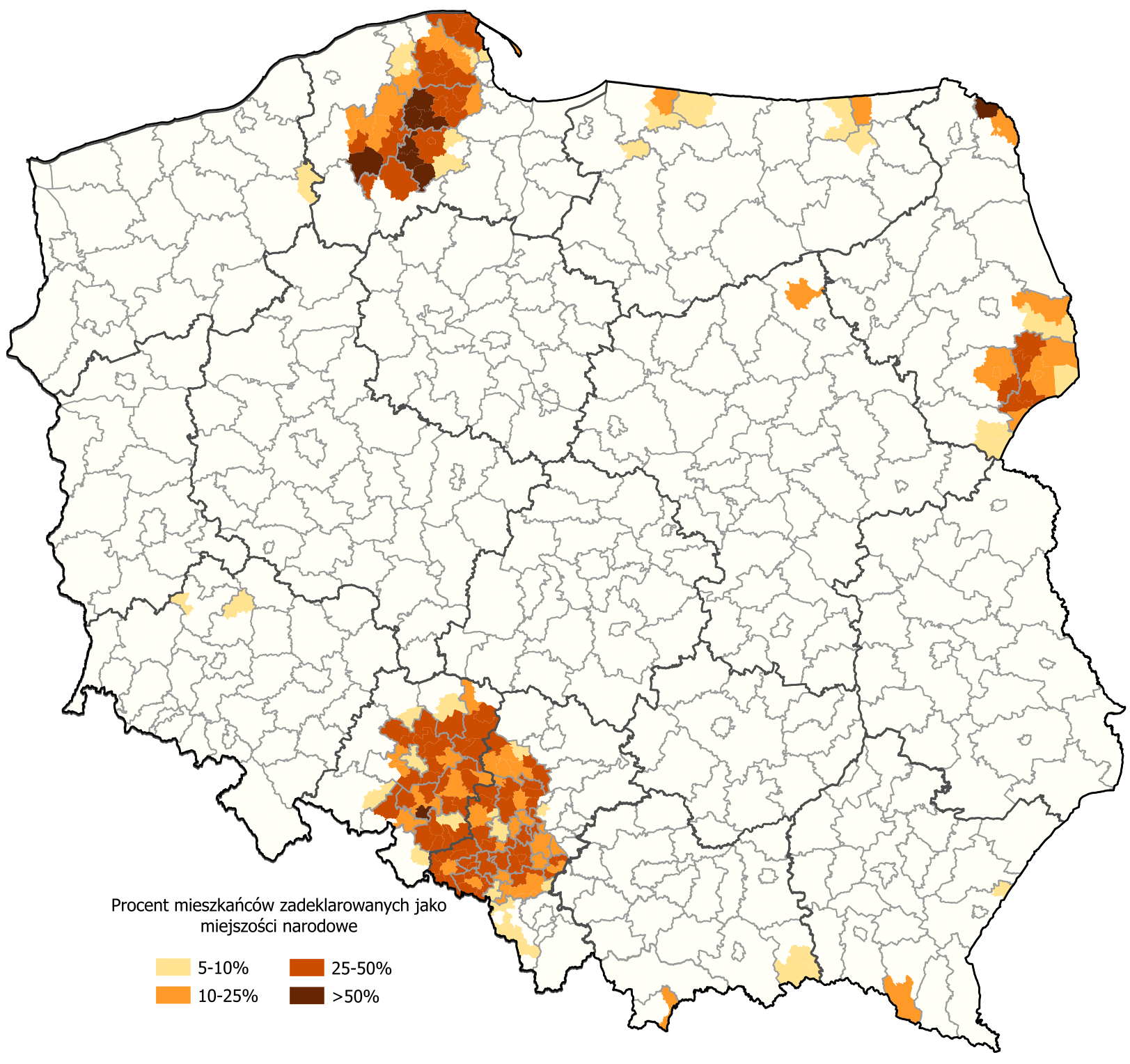
Map of Poland showing areas that are at least 5% inhabited by ethnic minorities

In the Polish census of 2002, 96.7 percent claimed Polish nationality and 97.8 percent said that they speak Polish at home. In the 2011 census, 1.44 percent of Poland's 39 million inhabitants said that they had an ancestry other than Polish. That figure included 418,000 who identified as Silesian (362,000 as a single ethnicity and 391,000 as a second ethnicity) and 17,000 Kashubians (16,000 as a single ethnicity). Recognized minorities were 0.3 percent of the population: 49,000 Germans (26,000 a single ethnicity), 36,000 Ukrainians (26,000 single-ethnicity), 7,000 Lemkos (5,000 single-ethnicity), 37,000 Belarusians (31,000 single-ethnicity), 12,000 Roma people (9,000 single-ethnicity), and 8,000 Russians (5,000 single-ethnicity); 0.2 percent of the population were foreign citizens.

In Poland, the following minorities are recognized as national minorities: Belarusian, Czech, Lithuanian, German, Armenian, Russian, Slovak, Ukrainian and Jewish, and as ethnic minorities: Karaim, Lemko, Roma and Tatar.

2002 census:

- 38,230,080 – Total population of Poland
- 36,983,720 – Polish
- 774,885 – Nationality not specified
- 471,475 – Non-Polish or multi-ethnic

Polish census of 2011:

- 38,512,000 – Total population of Poland
- 36,157,000 – Polish ethnicity
- 951,000 – Nationality not specified
- 1,404,000 declared non-Polish ethnicity first or second; 842,000 declared Polish and non-Polish ethnicity (52 percent of Silesians, 93 percent of Kashubians, 46 percent of Germans, and 40 percent of Ukrainians); 640,000 declared non-Polish nationality first (562,000 declared only non-Polish ethnicity); 802,000 declared non-Polish ethnicity second (50 percent Silesian, 26 percent Kashubian, eight percent German).

Polish census of 2021:

- 38,036,118 – Total population of Poland
- 36,620,217 – Only Polish ethnicity
- 974,852 – Polish and non-Polish ethnicity (respondents could declare up to two ethnicities)
- 397,848 – One non-Polish ethnicity
- 32,073 – Two non-Polish ethnicities
- 11,128 – Ethnicity not specified

Non-European ethnic groups in Poland according to the 2021 census
Major regions of origin	Population size	Most numerous ethnic groups included
North American ethnic groups	33,786	Americans, Canadians, Afro-Americans, etc.
West Asian ethnic groups	19,704	Armenians, Karaites, Turks, Arabs, Georgians, etc.
South Asian ethnic groups	16,266	Romani people, Indians, Pakistanis, Nepalis, etc.
Southeast Asian ethnic groups	6,677	Vietnamese, Filipinos, Thai, Indonesians, etc.
Central Asian ethnic groups	6,598	Tatars, Kazakhs, Uzbeks, Kyrgyz, Tajiks, etc.
Northeast Asian ethnic groups	6,263	Japanese, Chinese, Koreans, Mongols, etc.
Latin American ethnic groups	4,462	Brazilians, Mexicans, Peruvians, Colombians, etc.
Oceanian ethnic groups	4,260	Australians, New Zealanders, Papuans, Maoris, etc.
Sub-Saharan African ethnic groups	4,064	Nigerians, Ethiopians, Asante, Congolese, Zulus, etc.
North African ethnic groups	3,887	Egyptians, Algerians, Tunisians, Moroccans, etc.
North Caucasian ethnic groups	1,310	Chechens, Circassians, Balkars, Ingush, etc.
Caribbean ethnic groups	602	Cubans, Dominicans, Haitians, Jamaicans, etc.
Total non-European ethnic groups	107,879	

=== List of minorities ===
==== Armenians ====
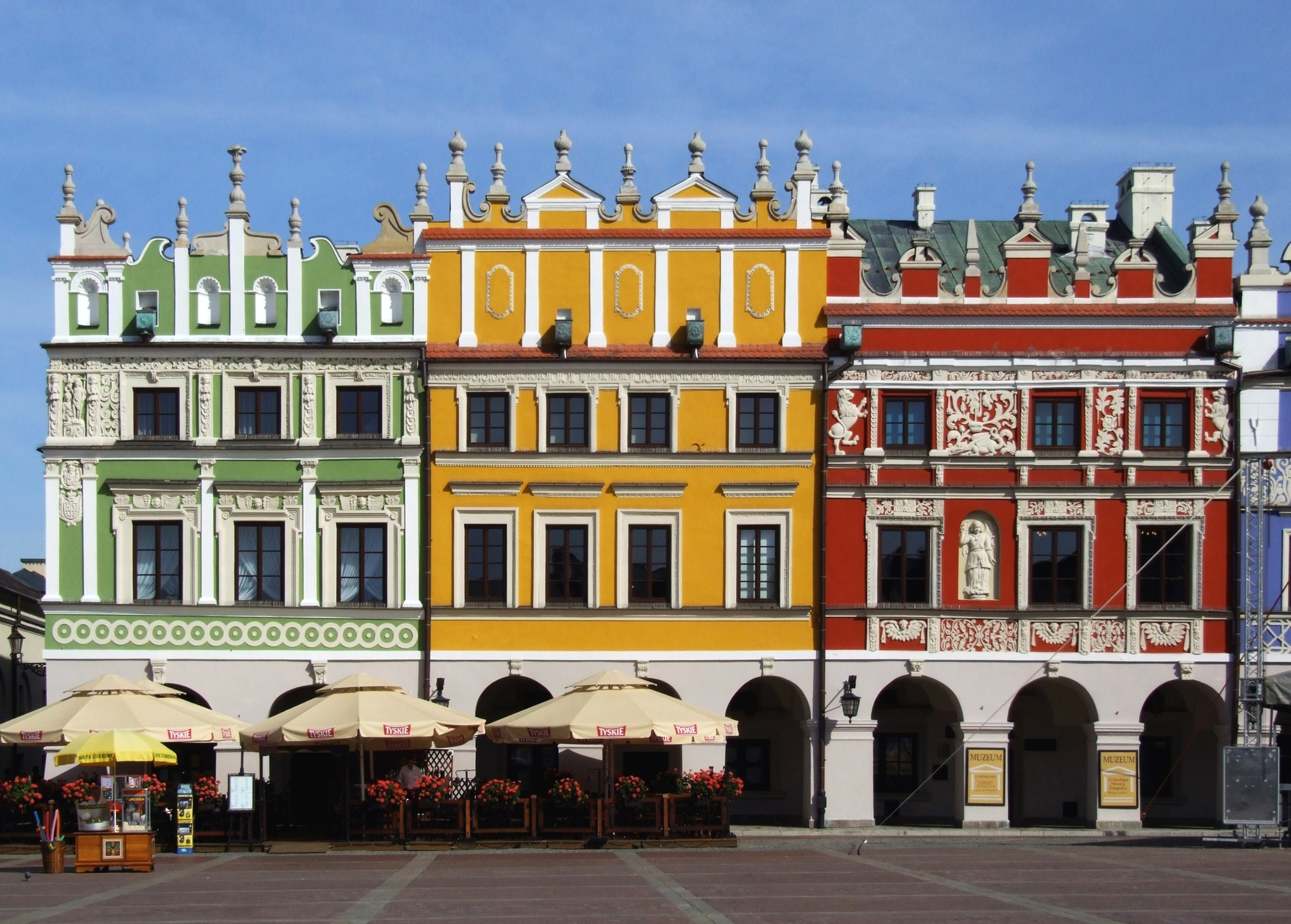
Renaissance-Baroque "Armenian Tenements" in Zamość

Around 50,000 Armenians settled in Poland in the 14th century, and an Armenian colony gradually formed through successive immigrations. According to the Polish census of 2002, there are 1,082 Armenians in Poland, although Armenian-oriented sources cite estimates as high as 92,000.

==== Belarusians ====
In the Polish census of 2002, 48,700 people said that they belong to this group. This number fell to 46,800 in the 2011 census. They live in close concentrations in southern and eastern Białystok, near and in areas adjoining the Polish-Belarusian border.

==== Chechens ====
Chechens live in small ethnic communities in major cities such as Warsaw, Kraków, and Gdańsk.

==== Czechs ====
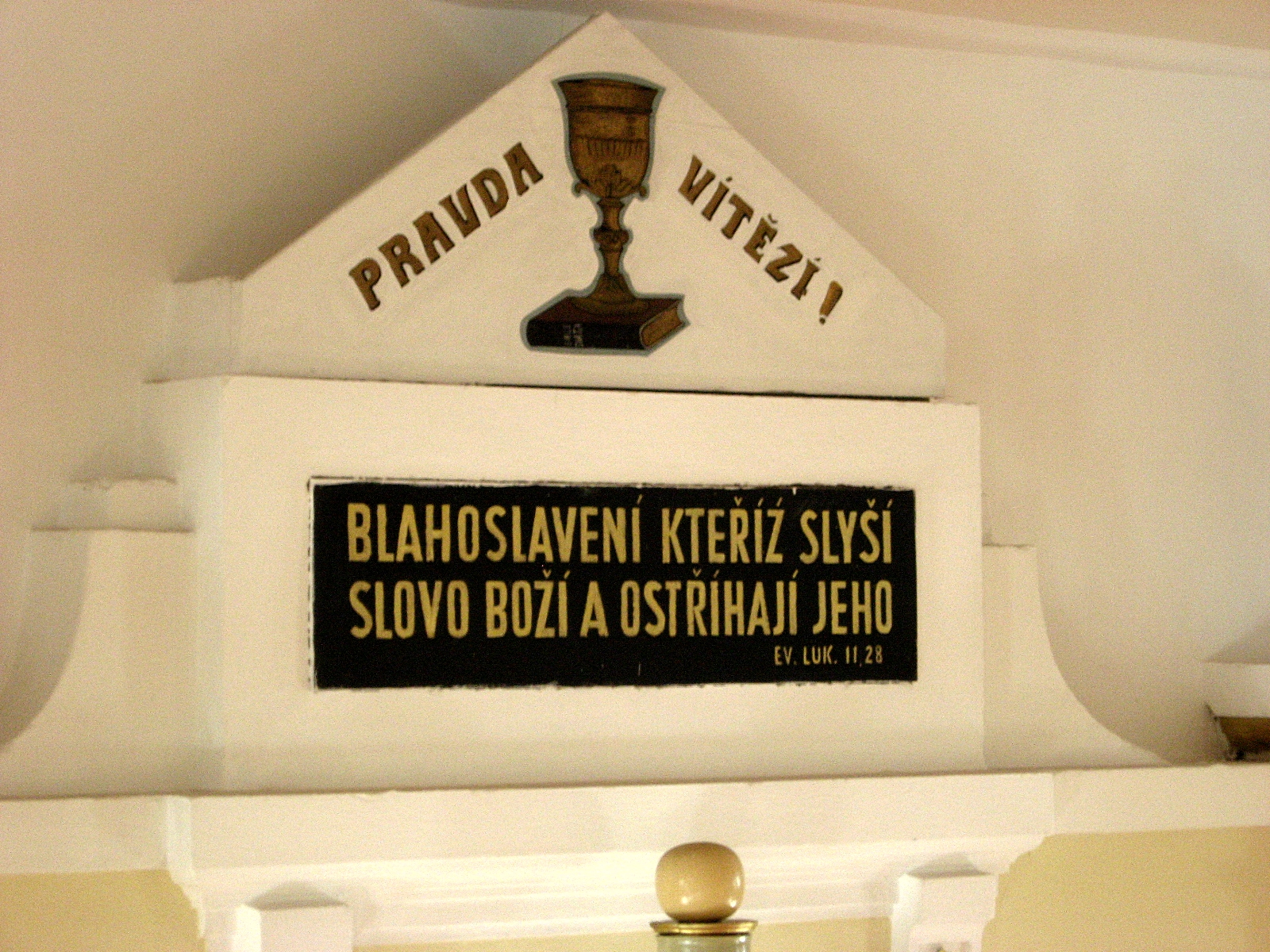
Czech inscription at the Polish Reformed Church in Zelów

According to the Polish census of 2002, 386 Czechs live in Poland; many live in Zelów or near the Czech border, such as in the Czech Corner. The best-known Pole with Czech roots was, arguably, painter Jan Matejko.

==== Danes ====
5,204 Danes live in Poland.

==== Dutch ====
The first place in present-day Poland where Dutch immigrants settled was Pasłęk in 1297, once renamed Holąd after the settlers. Since the 16th century, Poland was home to a sizeable Dutch diaspora, made up mainly of Mennonites, religious refugees from the Netherlands. In the 2011 Polish census, 3,927 people declared Dutch nationality, of which 3,326 declared both Polish and Dutch nationality.

==== Frisians ====
There were 109 self-declared Frisians in the 2002 census, including 36 Polish citizens.

==== French ====
Historically, there were three major surges of French migration to Poland, consisting of persecuted Huguenots following the St. Bartholomew's Day massacre of 1572, then in the 17th century when French noblewomen Marie Louise Gonzaga and Marie Casimire Louise de la Grange d'Arquien were Queens consorts of Poland, and the flight of French monarchists, merchants and craftsmen from the French Revolution in the late 18th century. There were 1,633 French in the 2002 census, including 1,068 Polish citizens.

==== Germans ====
Ethnic Germans remain in Silesia, Pomerania, Warmia-Masuria and Lubusz Land. According to the 2002 census, 147,094 Germans live primarily in the region of Opole, Katowice and Częstochowa (southern Poland). Germans first came to Silesia during the Late Middle Ages, and largely either fled from the advancing Eastern Front during World War II or were expelled in accordance with the Potsdam Agreement after the war.

==== Gorals ====
Polish Gorals are an ethnic group in southern Poland who speak a Polish dialect which has been heavily influenced by Slovak. Some urban Poles find this dialect difficult to understand. Polish Gorals live primarily in the region of Podhale and are separated from Slovak Gorals by the High Tatra mountains, which (with Zakopane Style architecture) are an important part of Goral identity and part of the reason why Zakopane is a popular tourist destination and winter resort town. A Nazi attempt to Germanize the Goralenvolk during its World War II occupation of Poland was largely unsuccessful.

==== Greeks ====
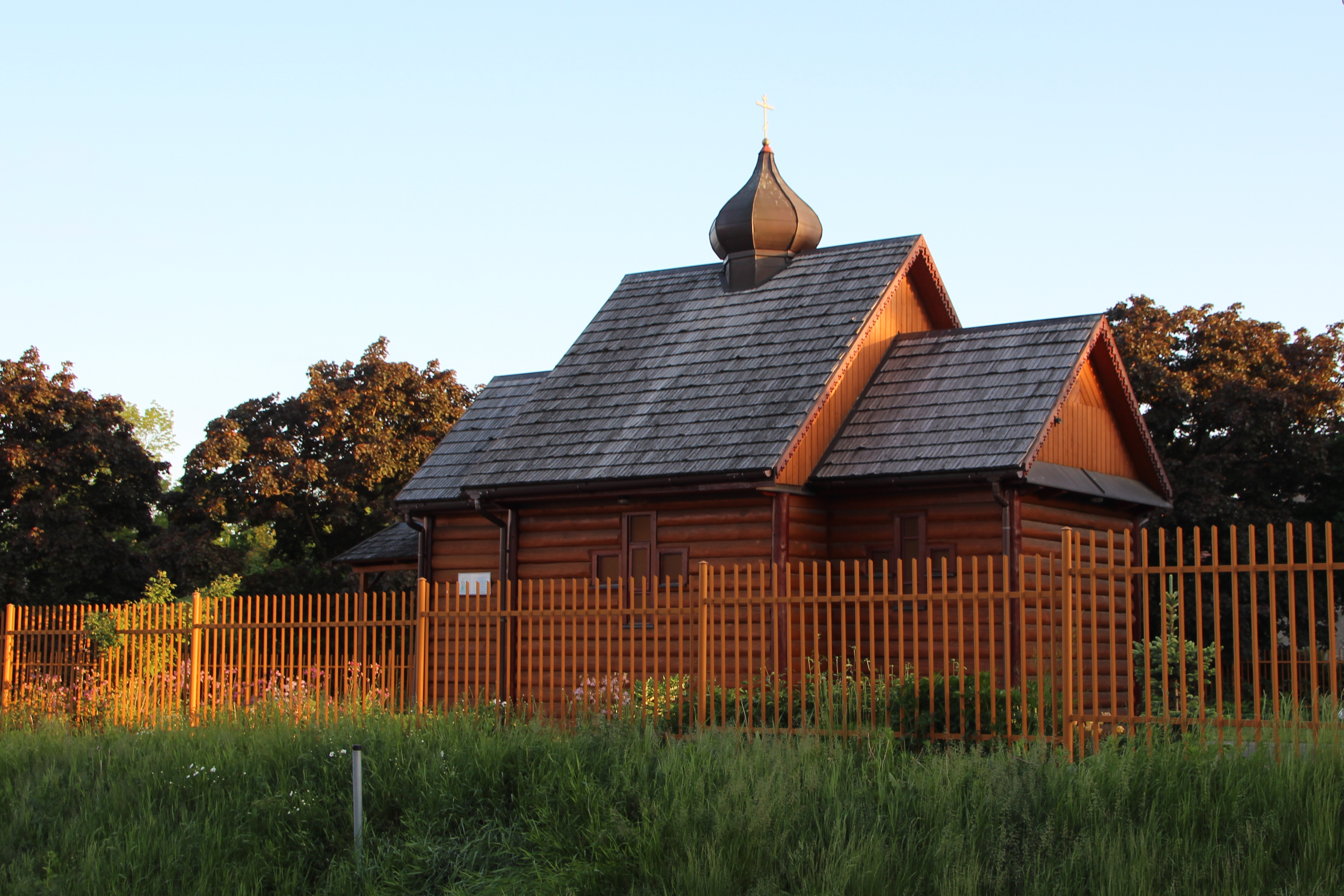
Orthodox Parish of Saints Constantine and Helen in Zgorzelec, founded by Greek immigrants

Four to five thousand Greeks live in central and southeast Poland, most of whom came in 1949, after the Greek Civil War. It is estimated that after this conflict, some 14,000 Greeks came to Poland, settling mainly in the town of Zgorzelec in Lower Silesia. In the course of time, most of them returned to their homeland or moved to Germany. According to the 2011 census, there are 3,600 individuals who claim some form of Greek identity living in Poland. Among famous Poles of Greek origin are musicians Eleni Tzoka and Apostolis Anthimos.

==== Jews ====
The Jewish percentage of the total population of various Polish voivodeships in 2021.

Poland had the world's largest population of Jews for many centuries, and Jews were Poland's first minority group. However, the community did not survive World War II. Before the war, there were 3,474,000 Jews in Poland. 90% of Polish Jews were killed during the Holocaust following the German invasion of Poland. Those who escaped mostly went to the United States, Israel, Great Britain or Latin America. Many survivors willingly emigrated or were expelled by the Communists after the war. In the 2002 census, there were 1,055 Jewish people in Poland. In the 2011 census, that number increased to 7,353. They live primarily in large cities such as Warsaw, Wrocław, Kraków and Lublin.

==== Karaites ====
There were 45 Crimean Karaites in the 2002 census, 43 of whom were Polish citizens.

==== Kashubians ====
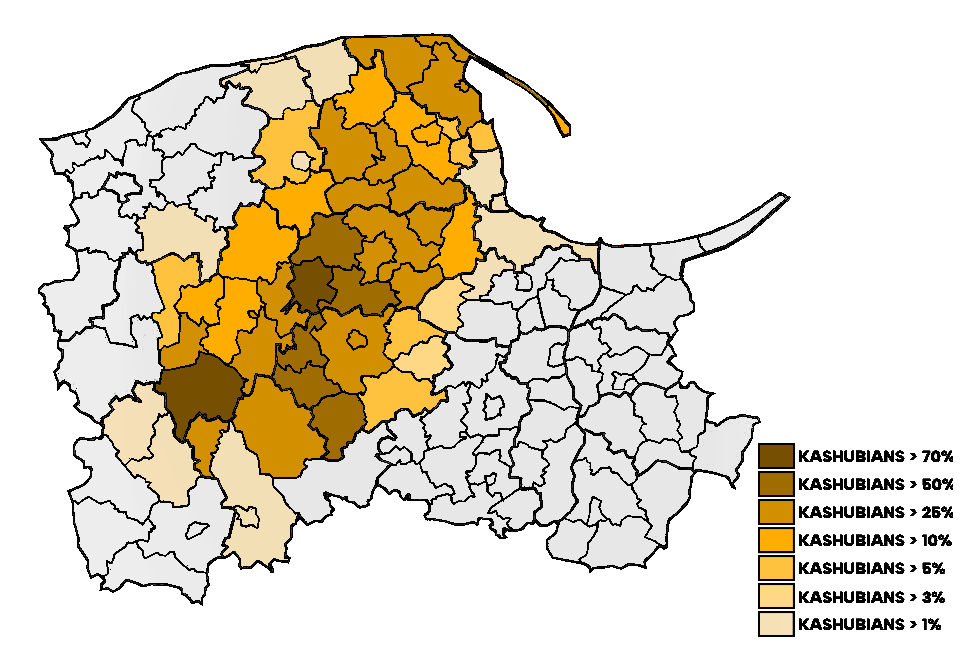
Population of Kashubians in the Pomeranian Voivodeship in 2021.

In the Polish census of 2002, 5,100 people declared Kashubian ethnicity; 52,665 declared Kashubian as their native language. In ten municipalities, more than 20 percent of the population spoke Kashubian: Przodkowo (49 percent), Sulęczyno (48.6 percent), Stężyca (43.2 percent), Sierakowice (39.9 percent), Linia (35.5 percent), Chmielno (34.8 percent), Puck (30.9 percent), Somonino (30.8 percent), Szemud (26.3 percent) and Parchowo (22.6 percent). In the 2011 census, the number of people citing Kashubian as their first single ethnicity increased to 17,000; 229,000 declared Kashubian as their first or second ethnicity.

==== Kursenieki ====
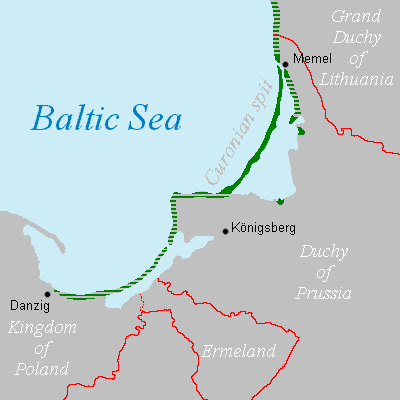
The Kursenieki-populated area in 1649

The Kursenieki, also known as Kuronowie Pruscy and Kurończycy in Polish and Kuršininkai in Lithuanian, are a nearly-extinct Baltic ethnic group living along the Curonian Spit. They were assimilated by the Germans except along the Curonian Spit, where some still live.

==== Lemkos and Rusyns ====
In the 2002 census, 5,850 Polish citizens declared themselves Lemkos and 62 identified as Rusyns. In the 2011 census, 10,000 people declared Lemkos as their first or second ethnicity.

==== Lithuanians ====
There were 5,846 Lithuanians in Poland (5,639 Polish citizens), according to the 2002 census. They live in close concentrations in Suwałki in north-eastern Poland and in Puńsk Municipality, where they were 74.4 percent of the population.

==== Macedonians ====
There were 286 Macedonians in Poland in the 2002 census, including 187 Polish citizens. Five thousand Macedonian speakers were mentioned in 1970.

==== Masurians ====
There were 46 self-declared Masurians in the 2002 census, all Polish citizens.

==== Romani ====
There were 12,731 Romani people in Poland, according to the 2002 census. The Polish Roma population suffered heavily from their attempted extermination by Germany during World War II. They are dispersed and live around the country, although they are more numerous in the south.

==== Russians ====
Russians are scattered around Poland, but live mainly in the east. There were 3,244 Russians in Poland in the 2002 census. This includes Old Believers, numbering two to three thousand in north-eastern Poland.

==== Scots ====
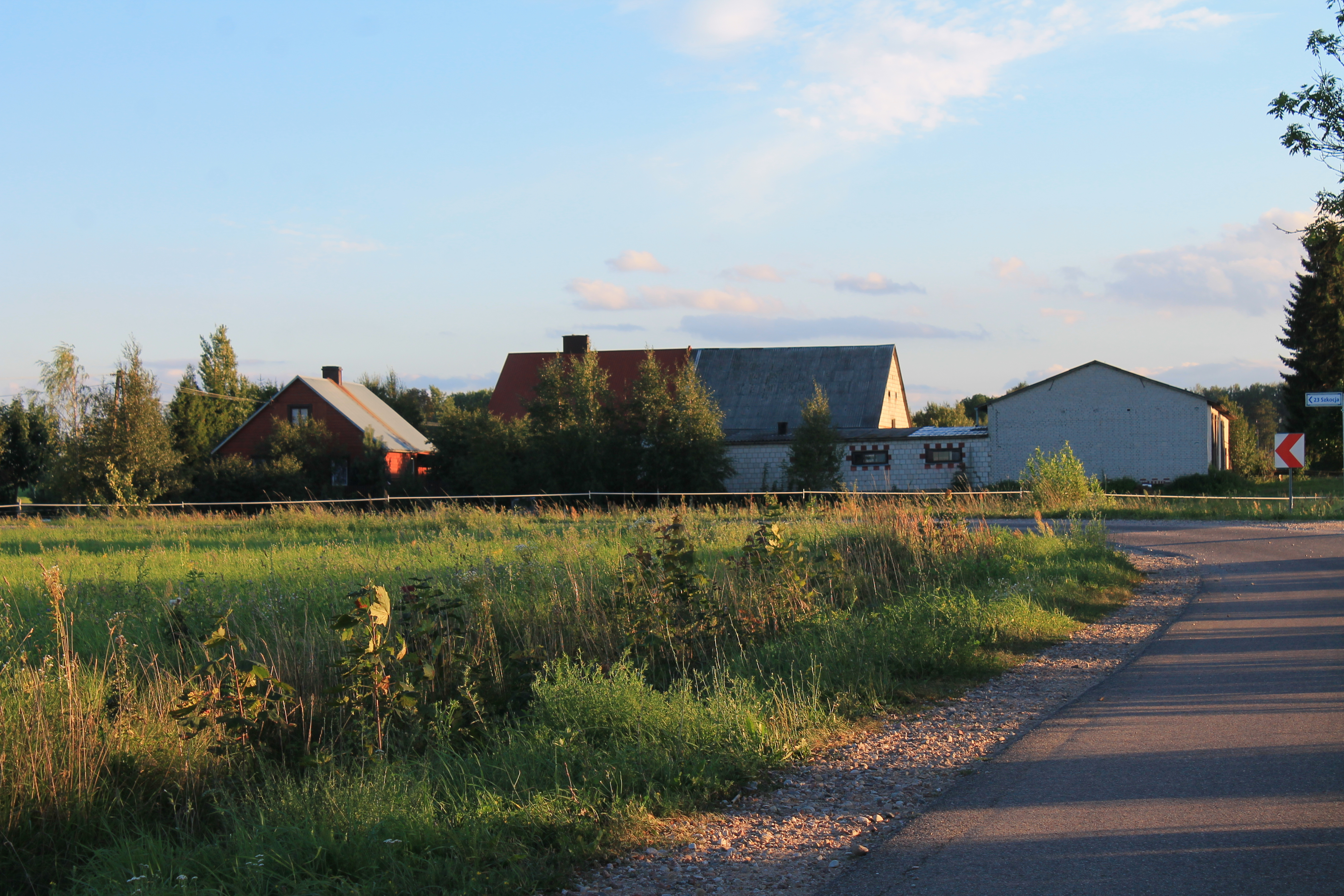
Modern view of Szkocja (Polish for Scotland), a village founded for Scottish settlers

In 1380, the first Scots settled in Gdańsk, founding what would eventually become a significant Scottish diaspora in Poland. Scottish people migrated to Poland in large numbers in the mid-16th century. Mostly from the Highlands and mainly Catholic and Episcopalian, they fled religious persecution and harsh economic conditions. There was extensive trade between Scotland's eastern ports, such as Dundee, Leith and Aberdeen, and towns such as Gdańsk and Königsberg (modern Kaliningrad). William Lithgow, who visited Poland in 1616, reported an estimated 30,000 Scottish families living in the country which he described as "... a mother and nurse for the youth and younglings of Scotland ... in cloathing, feeding, and inrichening them". Many came from Dundee and Aberdeen, and could be found in towns on the banks of the Vistula as far south as Kraków. It is believed that many Poles have unacknowledged Scottish ancestry. There were 26 self-declared Scots in the 2011 census, including 13 Polish citizens.

==== Silesians ====
In the 2002 census, 173,153 people declared Silesian ethnicity and about 60,000 listed Silesian as their native language. In the 2011 census, Silesian ethnicity was declared by 809,000 responders out of five million in the region (including 362,000 who declared it as their only ethnicity, 418,000 who declared it as their first ethnicity, and 415,000 who declared it with a Polish ethnicity.

==== Slovaks ====
Slovaks live in southern Poland, and there were 1,710 in the 2002 census. Polish Slovaks inhabit two small frontier regions in Spisz and Orawa (near the Polish-Slovak border). Larger groups of Slovaks live in Kraków and Silesia.

==== Swedes ====
Swedes live in Warsaw, Szczecin, Kamień Pomorski, Gdańsk, and Wrocław.

==== Tatars ====
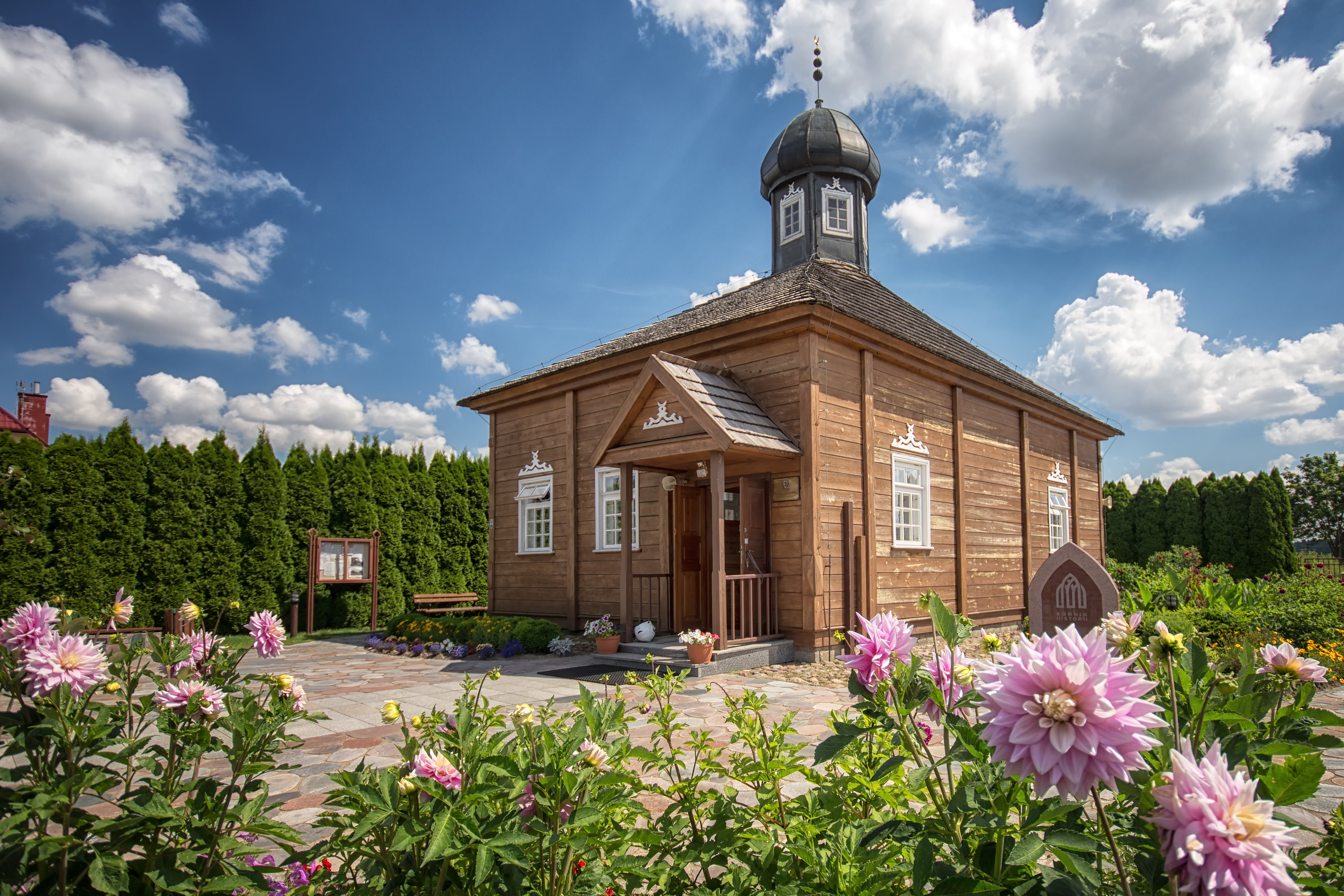
Bohoniki Mosque

Small populations of Polish Lipka Tatars practice Islam. Some Polish villages, mainly in northeastern Poland's Podlaskie Voivodeship, have mosques. Tatars arrived as mercenary soldiers during the late 14th century. The 2002 census listed 447 people declaring this ethnicity.

==== Ukrainians ====
Before the Russian-Ukrainian War, Ukrainians in Poland were scattered throughout eastern and northern districts. In the Polish census of 2002, 27,172 people declared that they belonged to this group.

==== Vietnamese ====
About 30,000 Vietnamese lived in Poland in 2015, primarily in large cities. They publish a number of pro- and anti-Communist newspapers. The first immigrants were Vietnamese students at Polish universities after World War II. Their numbers increased slightly during the Vietnam War, when agreements between the Vietnamese and Polish governments allowed Vietnamese guest workers to receive industrial training in Poland. A large number of Vietnamese immigrants arrived after 1989.

==== Other ====
Groups of Americans (1,541 in 2002, 992 of whom had Polish citizenship), Britons, Turks (232, including 74 Polish citizens), Hungarians (579, including 228 Polish citizens), Italians (1,367, including 835 Polish citizens), Serbs, Croats, Bulgarians (1,112, including 404 Polish citizens), Romanians, Georgians, Palestinians (229, including 146 Polish citizens) and other Arabs, Kurds, Scandinavians, and Flemings (23, including 10 Polish citizens) live in Poland.

== See also ==
- Demographics of Poland
- Little Treaty of Versailles
- Racism in Poland
- Refugees in Poland
- Africans in Poland
