= 2011 European Union census =

2011 EU census, or EU population and housing census 2011 was an EU-wide census in 2011 in all EU member states.

== 2011 EU member state censuses ==
Country	Dedicated article	Related articles
Austria		Demographics of Austria
Belgium		Demographics of Belgium
Bulgaria		Demographics of Bulgaria
Cyprus		Demographics of Cyprus
Czech Republic	2011 Czech census	Demographics of the Czech Republic
Denmark		Demographics of Denmark, Census in Denmark
Estonia	2011 Estonian census	Demographics of Estonia
Finland		Demographics of Finland
France		Demographics of France
Germany	2011 German census	Demographics of Germany, Census in Germany
Greece	2011 Greek census	Demographics of Greece
Hungary		Demographics of Hungary
Ireland	2011 Irish census	Demographics of the Republic of Ireland
Italy	2011 Italian census	Demographics of Italy
Latvia		Demographics of Latvia
Lithuania	2011 Lithuanian census (lt)	Demographics of Lithuania
Luxembourg		Demographics of Luxembourg
Malta		Demographics of Malta
Netherlands		Demographics of the Netherlands
Poland	2011 Polish census	Demographics of Poland, Census in Poland
Portugal		Demographics of Portugal
Romania	2011 Romanian census	Demographics of Romania
Slovakia		Demographics of Slovakia
Slovenia		Demographics of Slovenia
Spain		Demographics of Spain, Census in Spain
Sweden		Demographics of Sweden, Census in Sweden
United Kingdom	2011 United Kingdom census	
