= Census in Poland =

Censuses in Poland:

== 18th-19th centuries ==
- Polish-Lithuanian Commonwealth (census of 1789, see pl:Lustracja dymów i podanie ludności)

Poland was partitioned between German Prussia, Russian Empire, and Austria-Hungary since 1795.

- Russian Empire Census (Privislinsky Krai census of 1897)
- German census of 1895 (Province of Posen, Province of Silesia, Province of Pomerania, West Prussia, Province of Brandenburg)
- Austro-Hungarian census (Grand Duchy of Cracow, Kingdom of Galicia and Lodomeria)

== 20th century ==
- Polish census of 1921
- Polish census of 1931
- Polish census of 1950
- Polish census of 1960
- Polish census of 1970
- Polish census of 1978
- Polish census of 1988

In addition to these censuses, there were also:

- the Polish summary survey of 1946
- microcensus (representative surveys) of 1974, 1984 and 1995
- surveys of agricultural population

== 21st century ==
- Polish census of 2002
- Polish census of 2011
- Polish census of 2021

== See also ==
- Central Statistical Office (Poland)
