= Chrousa =

Chrousa Χρούσα
- Community
- Location within Greece
- Coordinates: 37°23′53″N 24°55′26″E
- Country: Greece
- Administrative region: South Aegean
- Regional unit: Syros
- Municipality: Syros-Ermoupoli
- Municipal unit: Ano Syros

Population (2021)
  - Community: 281
- Time zone: UTC+2 (EET)
  - Summer (DST): UTC+3 (EEST)
- Area code: 22810

Chrousa (Greek: Χρούσα, also: Χρούσσα - Chroussa) is a settlement on the south side of the island of Syros and is 8.5 km from the island capital Ermoupoli.

In Chrousa we find traditional newly built houses, villas and old mansions, while in relation to various islands of the Cyclades, where the landscapes are dry and deserted, there is quite dense vegetation in the specific village. A vast pine tree forest embraces the village, a destination of migratory birds threatened by the unconscious hunters of the island.

== Administration and population ==
The local community of Chrousa belongs to the municipal unit of Ano Syros, which belongs to the Municipality of Syros - Ermoupolis, Syros - Ermoupolis. Before Kallikratis Programme, it was part of the Municipality of Ano Syros. According to the census of 2021, 281 inhabitants live in the area.

== Churches ==
At the top of a hill dominates the Catholic Church of Our Lady of Phaneromeni, built around [1890]. It celebrates on [September 24], and a multitude of believers attend that day on the open Divine Liturgy. Next to the church there is the old chapel dating back to the 14th century and the 14th century.

Two Orthodox temples have been built in the center of the settlement: the church of Saint Spyridon (one-storied ceramic-temple temple) built in 1854 and the Holy Church of the Theotokos (one-aisled royal temple) built in the same year residents of the city who had resorted to Chroussa to avoid the cholera epidemic.

== Children's Camping ==
The Children's Camp was operated in the settlement, where scouts from all over Greece camped in the summer and were living in the area with their events. They also camped soldiers-soldiers, where they had exercises and shots.

The only charming camp, where for decades (from the [1950] to the beginning of the new millennium) was breathing, it is now deserted and destroyed. The only exceptions are the children playing a ball at the village's dirt pitch and the great feast-institution of the island that takes place on May Day and is organized by the Cultural Association of Chrousa.
