= Ukrainians in Poland =

Ethnic group

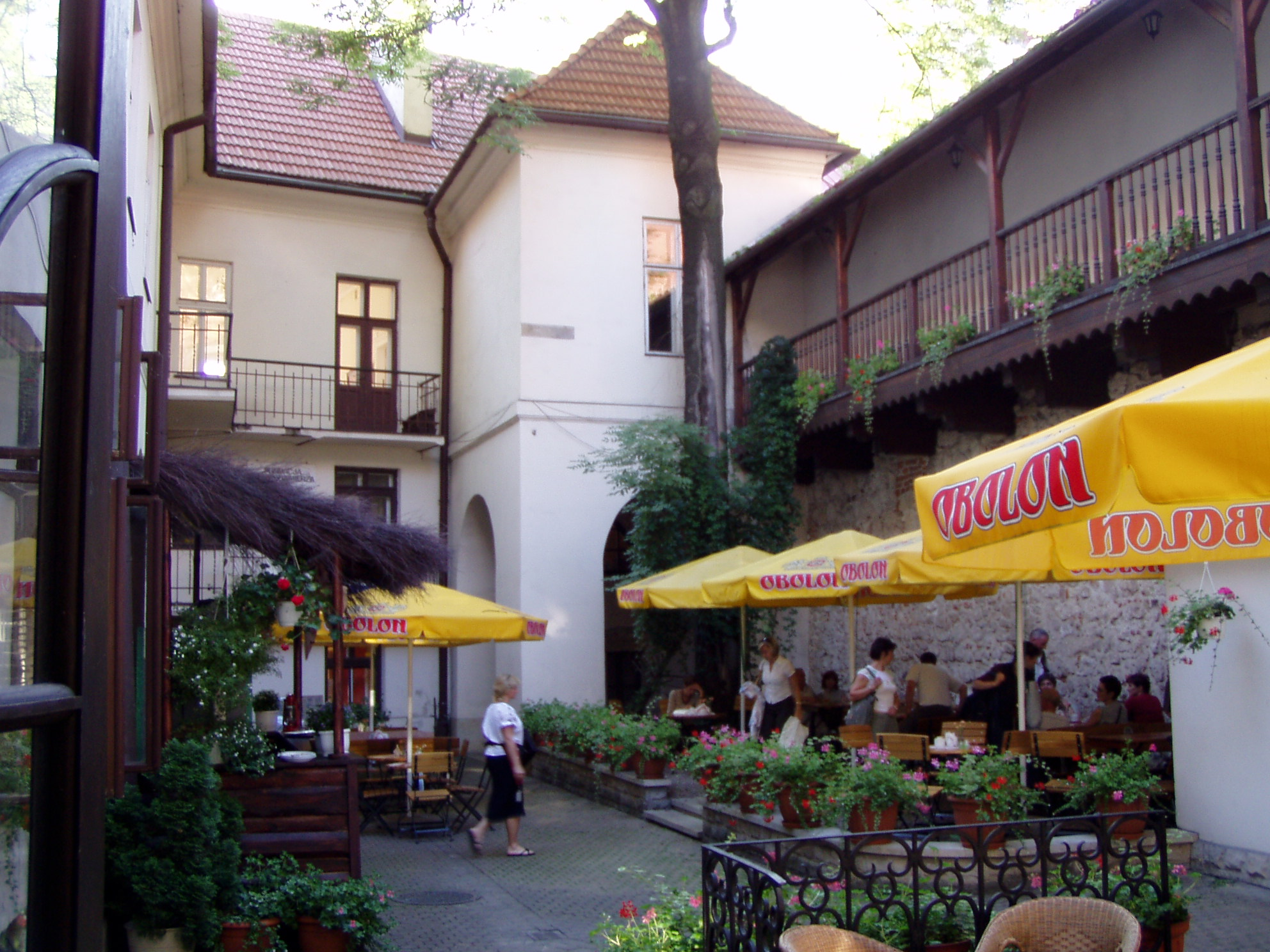
- Kyivan Rus Foundation of St. Volodymyr in Kraków with courtyard patio of a fine dining restaurant

Total population
- 1,750,000 (2025)

Regions with significant populations
- Central: Warsaw; north east: Olsztyn, Elbląg; north west: Szczecin, Słupsk, Koszalin; south west: Legnica and Wrocław; south east: Lublin and Rzeszów

Languages
- Ukrainian, Russian, Polish, Rusyn

Religion
- Orthodox Christianity, Greek Catholicism

Related ethnic groups
- Ukrainians in Lithuania

Ukrainians in Poland (Ukrainian: Українці Польщі, romanized: Ukrayintsi Polshchi; Polish: Ukraińcy w Polsce) have various legal statuses: ethnic minority, temporary and permanent residents, and refugees. According to the Polish census of 2011, the Ukrainian minority in Poland was composed of approximately 51,000 people (including 11,451 without Polish citizenship but living permanently). Some 38,000 respondents named Ukrainian as their first identity (28,000 as their sole identity), 13,000 as their second identity, and 21,000 declared Ukrainian identity jointly with Polish nationality. However, these numbers have changed since the mid-2010s, with a large influx of economic immigrants and students from Ukraine to Poland, with official estimates of pre-invasion population ranging from 307,000 to nearly one million. The number of Ukrainians in Poland changed dramatically following the Russian invasion of Ukraine on 24 February 2022, rising to 1,75 million in 2025.

== Cultural life ==
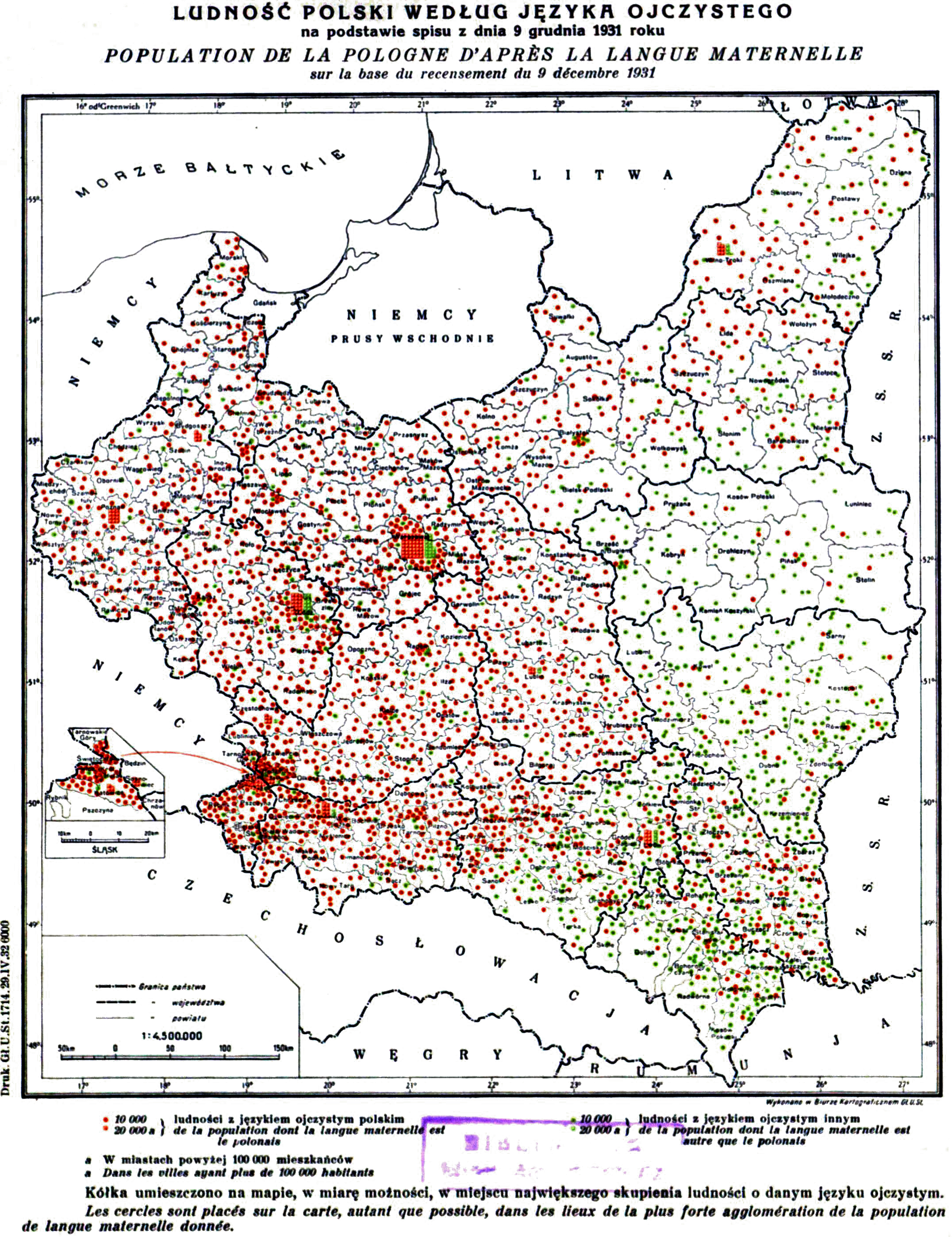
Speakers of minority languages based on Polish census of 1931

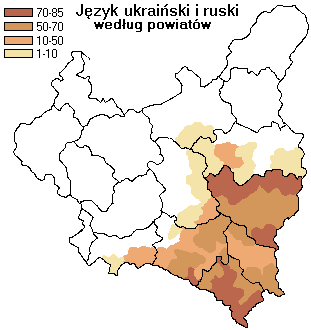
Ukrainian and Ruthenian language in the Second Polish Republic

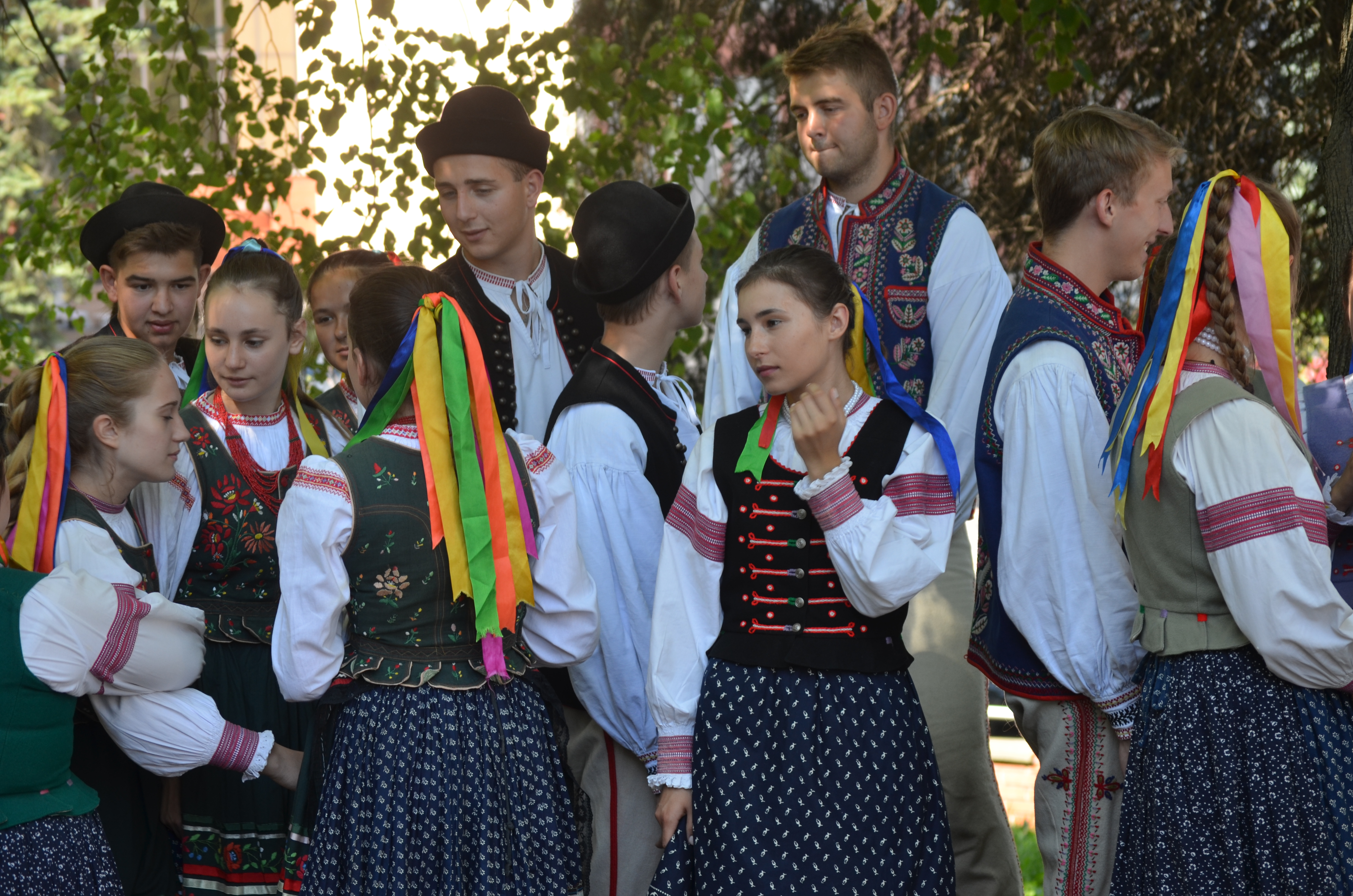
Ukrainian Lemkos are one of the ethnic groups inhabiting the Carpathian Mountains in what is now southeastern Poland

During the Polish People's Republic, the Ukrainian Social and Cultural Society (USKT) was the sole legal organ for Ukrainians in Poland. Since 1990, the main Ukrainian organizations in Poland include the Association of Ukrainians in Poland (Związek Ukraińców w Polsce), the successor to the USKT, and several others:

- Association of Ukrainians of Podlasie (Związek Ukraińców Podlasia),
- Ukrainian Society of Lublin (Towarzystwo Ukraińskie w Lublinie),
- Kyivan Rus Foundation of St. Volodymyr, pictured (Fundacja św. Włodzimierza Chrzciciela Rusi Kijowskiej),
- Association of Ukrainian Women (Związek Ukrainek),
- Ukrainian Educators' Society of Poland (Ukraińskie Towarzystwo Nauczycielskie w Polsce),
- Ukrainian Medical Society (Ukraińskie Towarzystwo Lekarskie),
- Ukrainian Club of Stalinist Political Prisoners (Stowarzyszenie Ukraińców – Więźniów Politycznych Okresu Stalinowskiego),
- Ukrainian Youth Association "ПЛАСТ" (Organizacja Młodzieży Ukraińskiej "PŁAST"),
- Ukrainian Historical Society (Ukraińskie Towarzystwo Historyczne),
- Association of Independent Ukrainian Youth (Związek Niezależnej Młodzieży Ukraińskiej).

The most important periodicals published in Ukrainian language include: Our Voice (Nasze Słowo) weekly, and Над Бугом і Нарвою (Nad Buhom i Narwoju) bimonthly.

The most important Ukrainian festivals and popular cultural events include: Festival of Ukrainian Culture in Sopot ("Festiwal Kultury Ukraińskiej" w Sopocie), Youth Market in Gdańsk ("Młodzieżowy Jarmark" w Gdańsku), Festival of Ukrainian Culture of Podlasie (Festiwal Kultury Ukraińskiej na Podlasiu "Podlaska Jesień"), Bytowska Watra, Spotkania Pogranicza in Głębock, Days of Ukrainian Culture in Szczecin and Giżycko (Dni Kultury Ukraińskiej), Children Festival in Elbląg (Dziecięcy Festiwal Kultury w Elblągu), Na Iwana, na Kupała in Dubicze Cerkiewne, Festival of Ukrainian Children Groups in Koszalin (Festiwal Ukraińskich Zespołów Dziecięcych w Koszalinie), Noc na Iwana Kupała in Kruklanki, Ukrainian Folklore Market in Kętrzyn (Jarmark Folklorystyczny "Z malowanej skrzyni"), Under the Common Skies in Olsztyn (Pod wspólnym niebem), and Days of Ukrainian Theatre (Dni teatru ukraińskiego) also in Olsztyn.

== History and trends ==
=== Since World War II ===
After the quashing of the Ukrainian Insurgent Army's campaign against the Soviet occupation at the end of World War II by the Soviet Union, about 140,000 Ukrainians residing within the new Polish borders were forcibly relocated. Initially they were encouraged to migrate to the Ukrainian Soviet Socialist Republic, but this was unpopular because of the recent Holodomor. After the Organization of Ukrainian Nationalists and Polish anti-communist resistance movements such as Freedom and Independence began resisting the repatriation of Ukrainians from Poland to the Soviet Union, the Polish People's Republic decided to relocate them internally. The Polish People's Army and Ministry of Public Security forcibly relocated them to northern and western Poland during Operation Vistula, settling them in the former Recovered Territories ceded to Poland at the Tehran Conference of 1943.

A total of 27,172 people declared Ukrainian nationality in the Polish census of 2002. Most of them lived in the Warmian-Masurian Voivodeship (11,881), followed by the West Pomeranian (3,703), Subcarpathian (2,984) and Pomeranian Voivodeships (2,831). Part of Lemkos (recognized in Poland as a distinct ethnic group) regard themselves as members of the Ukrainian nation, while others distance themselves from Ukrainians.

=== Economic migration ===
Ukrainian Settlement Permits and Temporary Residence Permits since Poland's EU accession
| Permits / Year | 2004 | 2005 | 2006 | 2007 | 2008 | 2009 | Total |
| Permanent Settlement Permits | 1,905 | 1,654 | 1,438 | 1,609 | 1,685 | 1,280 | 9,571 |
| Temporary Residence Permits | 8,518 | 8,304 | 7,733 | 7,381 | 8,307 | 8,489 | 48,736 |
| Grand total | | | | | | | 58,303 |
Source: EU Membership Highlights Poland's Migration Challenges, Warsaw

Since 1989, following the collapse of the Soviet Union, there has been a new wave of Ukrainian immigration, mostly of job seekers, tradesmen, and vendors, concentrated in larger cities with established markets. After Poland's 2004 accession to the European Union, in order to meet the requirements of the Schengen zone (an area of free movement within the European Union), the government was forced to make immigration to Poland more difficult for people from Belarus, Russia and Ukraine. Nevertheless, Ukrainians consistently receive the most settlement permits and the most temporary residence permits in Poland (see table). As a result of the Eastern Partnership, Poland and Ukraine have reached a new agreement replacing visas with simplified permits for Ukrainians residing within 30 km (19 mi) of the border. Up to 1.5 million people would benefit from this agreement which took effect on July 1, 2009. In 2017 the visa requirements were finally abolished for short stays of up to 90 days.

After 2014, more Ukrainians from eastern Ukraine, more men, and more younger Ukrainians have been working in Poland.

The overwhelming majority of applications for temporary residence are accepted. As a result, Ukrainians constituted 25% of the entire immigrant population of Poland in 2015.

In January 2016 the Embassy of Ukraine in Warsaw informed that the number of Ukrainian residents in Poland was half a million, and probably around one million in total. The Ukrainian Ambassador to Poland, Andrii Deshchytsia, noted that Ukrainian professionals enjoy a good reputation in Poland, and in spite of their growing numbers, Polish-Ukrainian relations remain very good.

According to the NBP, 1.2 million Ukrainian citizens worked legally in Poland in 2016. 1.7 million short-term work registrations were issued to them in 2017 (an eightfold increase compared to 2013). Ukrainian workers stay in Poland an average of 3–4 months.

The number of permanent residence permits increased from 5,375 in 2010 to 33,624 (14 September 2018), while the number of temporary residence permits increased from 7,415 to 132,099 over the same time period.

About 102,000 Ukrainian citizens received Karta Polaka, of whom some 15,500 obtained permanent residence permits in the period from 2014 to March 2018.

=== Russian invasion of Ukraine ===
==== Refugees ====
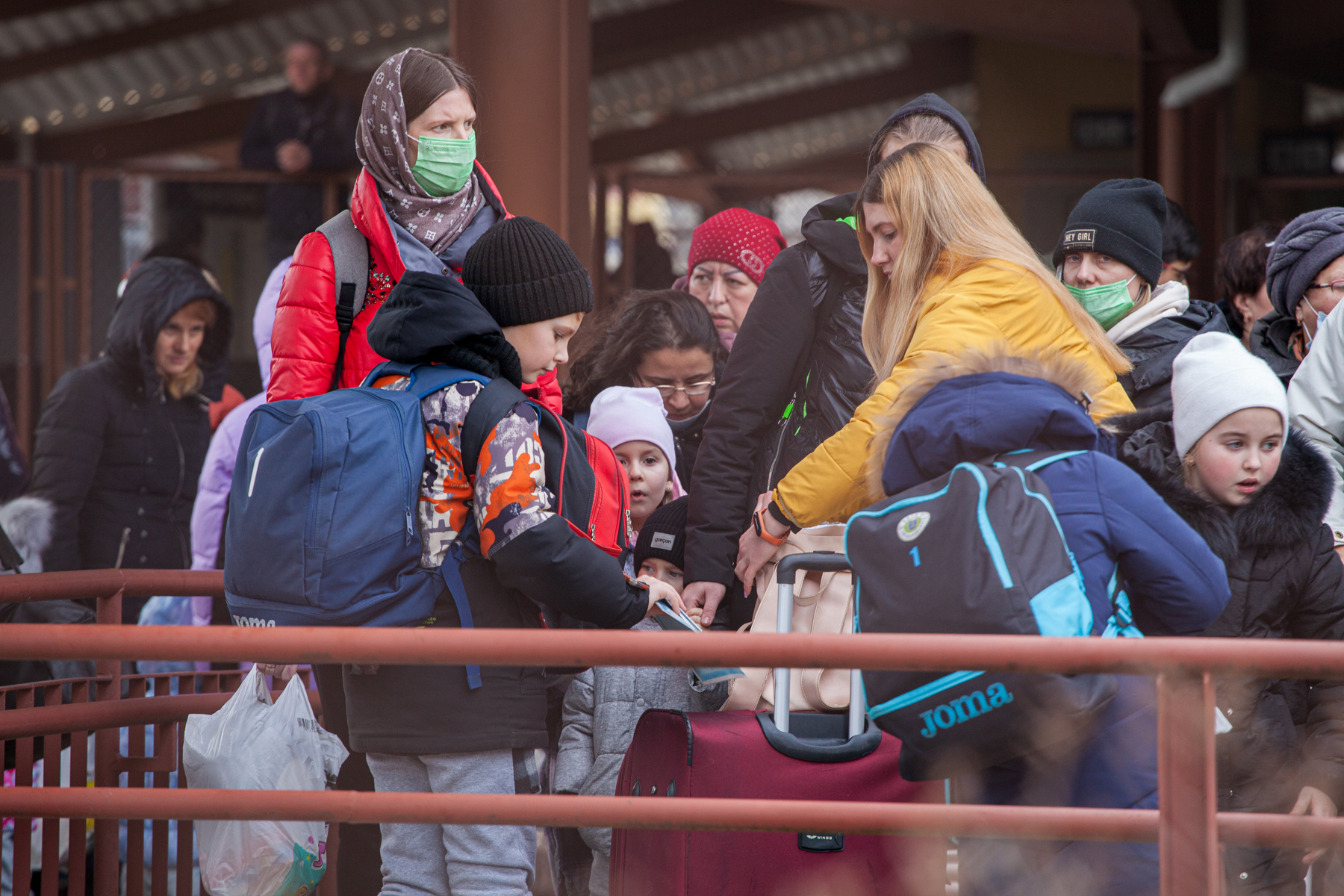
Ukrainian refugees in Przemyśl, Poland on 27 February 2022

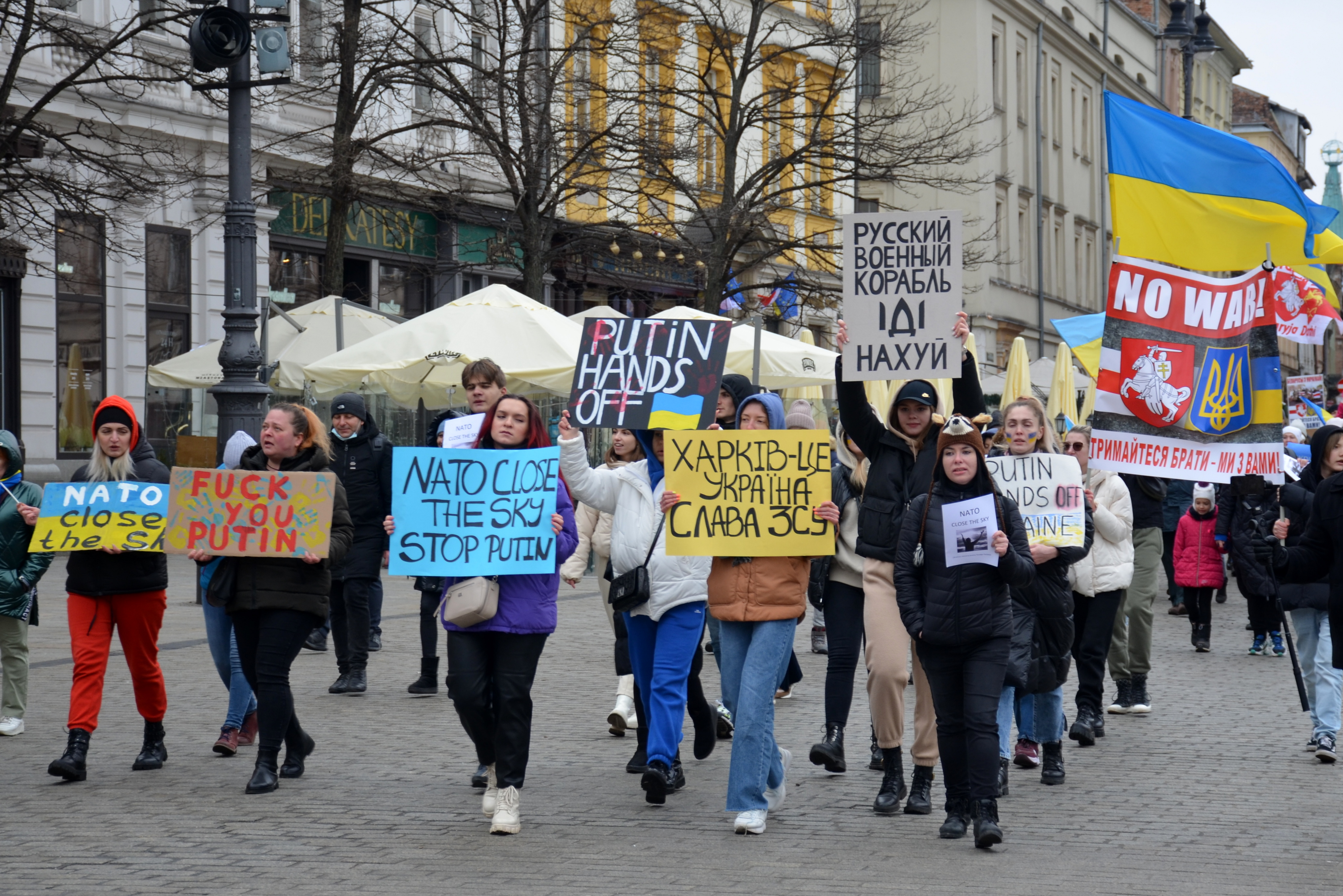
Ukrainian refugees in Kraków protest against the war, 6 March 2022

Following the 2014–2015 Russian military intervention in Ukraine, including its annexation of Crimea ("Helsinki Declaration"), the situation changed dramatically. Poland began taking in large numbers of refugees from the Russo-Ukrainian War as part of the EU's refugee program. The policy of strategic partnership between Kyiv and Warsaw was extended to military and technical cooperation, but the more immediate task, informed Poland's State secretary Krzysztof Szczerski, was Ukraine's constitutional reform leading to broad decentralization of power. The number of applications for refugee status rose 50 times following the start of War in Donbas in 2014. At the time most applicants were not eligible to claim refugee protection in Poland, because Ukraine as a sovereign country with a democratic government remained fully accountable to its citizens. While the conflict remained frozen until 2022, resident visas in Poland were available in other immigration categories. After the 2022 Russian invasion of Ukraine newly arriving refugees may apply under the standard EU asylum procedure or receive emergency temporary protection.

In 2022, Poland took in almost 1.5 million Ukrainian refugees. The migration resulted in a 50% rise in the population of Rzeszów, the largest city in south-eastern Poland. Warsaw's population increased by 15%, Kraków's by 23%, and Gdańsk's by 34%. Ukrainian refugees have the legal right to reside and work across the European Union. They are also entitled to the same benefits as Poles, including health insurance, free public education, and child allowance. Before the war, the presence of Ukrainians on the Polish labor market was significant. It has been presumed that employing several hundred thousand more people should not be a problem (this is already partially corroborated by the fact that nearly 150,000 newly arrived war refugees have entered the Polish labor market). However, such an outlook can be overly optimistic.

The recent influx consists primarily of women with children, whereas prior to the war, Ukrainians in Poland were predominantly employed in male-dominated occupations. Thus, there may be disparities between the available talents and the requirements of the labor market. This will necessitate a very high level of training and retraining opportunities tailored to the Ukrainian professional profile. Additional measures will be required to prevent threats such as workplace exploitation, abuse, and sexual harassment, which are to be expected given the magnitude of the phenomenon and the limited bargaining power of war refugees.

In the short term, due to the uniqueness of the situation, tensions can be easily avoided, but they are expected to emerge in the medium and long term. Especially people using public services may experience a deterioration in the standard of living due to the presence of war refugees who will also be entitled to state support. A similar situation may also take place in the labor market, with possible adverse effects, particularly on the local scale. These risks should be identified, monitored and addressed through well-tailored public policies, including communication campaigns.

Less than a month after the invasion, the Polish government established the Aid Fund, run by Bank Gospodarstwa Krajowego, which funds all actions and programs aimed at assisting and integrating Ukrainian refugees.

In January 2025, Polish Prime Minister Donald Tusk supported proposals to reduce benefits for Ukrainian refugees in Poland. From 1 July 2026, Ukrainian refugees, including the elderly, were no longer provided with free refugee accommodation to encourage Ukrainians to return home after four years of support, or to support themselves financially. The cost of the support has been estimated at 40 billion złoty (£8 billion).

==== Military volunteering for Ukraine ====
In April 2024, the Polish government offered to repatriate Ukrainian men of military age living in Poland to Ukraine to be drafted into the Ukrainian army. It is estimated that there are about 300–400,000 Ukrainian men living in Poland.

===== Ukrainian Legion =====
To encourage recruiting of Ukrainian citizens abroad, in early July 2024, the Polish and Ukrainian governments planned to establish a scheme to recruit Ukrainian citizens located in Poland for a new volunteer military formation called "Ukrainian Legion (Poland)", to serve in the Russo-Ukrainian War.

In mid July 2024, it was reported that thousands of Ukrainians in Poland have already registered to become part of the new formation. Discussions about the scope of the project are still ongoing, although training already begun as of late July.

== See also ==
- Poland–Ukraine relations
- Polish minority in Ukraine
- Demographics of Poland
- History of the Ukrainian minority in Poland
- Anti-Ukrainian sentiment
