= Demographic history of modern Greece =

Population censuses in Greece take place the first year of every decade. There have been 28 censuses in the history of modern Greece, conducted in various times, starting from 1828 at the end of the Greek War of Independence.

Year	Population	Area (km^{2})	Notes
1821	938,765	47,516	Population in the Peloponnese, Central Greece, and a few islands; 1821 estimate based on the 1828 census
1828	753,400		First national census of Greece
1834	693,592		First official census (1834–1835)
1838	752,077		
1840	850,246		
1841	861,019		
1842	853,005		
1843	915,059		
1844	930,925		
1845	960,236		
1848	986,731		
1853	1,035,527		
1856	1,062,627		
1861	1,096,810		
1870	1,457,894	50,211	First census after the donation of the Ionian Islands by Great Britain (1864)
1879	1,679,470		
1889	2,187,208	63,606	First census after Thessaly became part of Greece in 1881
1896	2,433,806		
1907	2,631,952	63,211	
1913	4,734,990	121,794	After the Balkan Wars, incorporation of Macedonia, Epirus, Crete, the eastern Aegean Islands (apart from the Dodecanese)
1920	5,531,474	149,150	Incorporation of Western Thrace and Eastern Thrace (apart from Constantinople) and Smyrna Zone
1928	6,204,684	129,880	Following loss of the Smyrna Zone and Eastern Thrace after the Treaty of Lausanne, and the population exchange between Greece and Turkey
1940	7,344,860		
1951	7,632,801	131,957	The Dodecanese Islands were incorporated in 1947
1961	8,388,553		
1971	8,768,641		
1981	9,740,417		
1991	10,258,364		
2001	10,964,020		
2011	10,815,197		
2021	10,482,487		

== See also ==
- Demographic history of Greece
