= Mikołaj Siwicki =

Ukrainian historian and literary critic (1917–2004)

Mikołaj Siwicki (Ukrainian: Мико́ла Ко́стьович Сиві́цький; Polish: Mykoła Sywićkyj; born 20 October 1917 – 13 January 2004, Warsaw, Poland) was a Ukrainian literary critic and historian (PhD in Ukrainian (literature)).

== Biography ==
Born in a village just outside Dubno, with the annexation of Volhynia from Poland by the Soviet Union, Siwicki was arrested in 1939 by the NKVD and spent five years incarcerated in a Gulag near Murmansk. At the end of his incarceration, he walked back to his childhood home in Ukraine, and because his Polish passport had not been changed to a Soviet one, enlisted in the Polish Army. He took part in the capture of Berlin where he lost a leg. As a decorated invalid Polish soldier, he was able to receive government subsidies to complete his tertiary education.

Siwicki completed his studies at University of Warsaw (graduated in 1956), doctorate at University of Krakow in 1983 under professor Ryszard Łużny with a dissertation on the Ukrainian writer and university professor Bohdan Łepky.

He was active in the formation of the Ukrainian Social and Cultural Society in Warsaw and became editor of the weekly newspaper Nasze Słowo (1956–1960), before being forced to change his employment to the editing of a Polish commercial newspaper

From 1956, Mykoła Siwicki lived in Bródnie, Warsaw.

- Numerous articles in journals such as "Slavia Orientalis", "Studia Polono-Slavica- Orientalia. Acta Litteraria".
- "Dzieje konfliktów polsko-ukraińskich" - about the Polish-Ukrainian conflicts in the 20th century.

Siwicki's works on Polish-Ukrainian conflict are considered by Polish sources to be outside scholarly mainstream. In his works he presents the Katyn massacre as revenge for alleged mistreatment of Ukrainians by Polish state during interwar period

== Publications ==
- Mikołaj Siwicki - Dzieje konfliktów polsko-ukraińskich. T.I, II, III, Warszawa 1994. Studia polsko- ukraińskie. Materiały z konferencji naukowej. Kamieniec Podolski, 29–31 May 1992, Kyiv-Przemyśl 1993
- Mikołaj Siwicki, Zapysky siroho volyniaka, Kyiv 1996, 2000, (ukr) - Микола Сивицький - "Записки сірого волиняка." - 2-е вид. - К.: Вид-во ім. О. Теліги, 2000.
- Mikołaj Siwicki - Paradoksy doby, Kijów 2000, (Ukrainian)- Микола Сивицький - "Парадокси доби.", Вид-во ім. О. Теліги, 2000.
- Mikołaj Siwicki - Obchody jubileuszowe Bohdana Łepkiego w Polsce. (1972 r. referat) Ukraine (1991 r. referat)

== Biography ==
- Ola Hnatiuk, Literatura ukraińska w pracach Instytutu Slawistyki PAN, w: 50 lat slawistki w Polskiej Akademii Nauk (1954–2004). Księga jubileuszowa Instytutu Slawistyki PAN, SOW, Warszawa 2004
