= Ukrainian Legion (Poland) =

Ukrainian military unit formed of Ukrainian citizens abroad

- Український легіон (Ukrainian)
- Founded: July 2024
- Country: Poland; Ukrainian residents in Poland
- Allegiance: Ukraine
- Branch: Armed Forces of Ukraine
- Type: Abroad citizen volunteer legion

The Ukrainian Legion (Ukrainian: Український легіон, Polish: Legion Ukraiński) is a volunteer unit composed of Ukrainian citizens residing in Poland, established through cooperation of the Ukrainian and Polish governments, and planned to be deployed for Ukraine in the Russian invasion of Ukraine.

The unit is planned to be trained and recruited in Poland, with later deployment in the war.

== History ==
To encourage recruiting of Ukrainian citizens abroad, in early July 2024, the Polish and Ukrainian governments planned to establish a scheme to recruit Ukrainian citizens located in Poland for a new volunteer military formation to serve in the Russo-Ukrainian War.

In mid July 2024, the Polish foreign minister Radosław Sikorski claimed that thousands of Ukrainians in Poland have already registered to become part of the new formation, however it later turned out that the minister was misinformed and there was no official registration at that time. Discussions about the scope of the project are still ongoing, although training already begun as of late July.

In October 2024, the Polish minister of defense Władysław Kosiniak-Kamysz reported that the number of Ukrainian volunteers is too small and that the plans to form a brigade of several thousand men had not been realized.

On 3 October 2024, a recruitment center for the Legion had been opened in Lubin.

By 12 November 2024, 600 people had applied for the legion. By 22 December the number has increased to 1,000.

On 24 December 2024, a Ukrainian ambassador stated that a unit of the legion were departed to Ukraine.

In January 2025, the legion had over 1,300 applicants wanting to join, including women.

== Organization ==
The units are planned to be trained by Western military advisors and have high quality standards, including modern military equipment financed by Poland.

Poland, along Lithuania and other EU allies, will train the volunteers on Polish training grounds.

All administrative work and recruitment is conducted by the Armed Forces of Ukraine, without Polish involvement.

After conclusion of service in the warzone, volunteers would be allowed to return and stay in Poland.

== Outlook ==
Poland has called on other European nations to provide similar schemes.

The Czech Republic expressed interest in the scheme and will consider involvement in the future, according to a ministry spokesman. Czech Defense Minister Jana Černochová indicated that discussions are underway to also create a Ukrainian legion in Czechia, citing a large Ukrainian community in the country as a reason.

== See also ==
- Kastuś Kalinoŭski Regiment
- Tactical group "Belarus"
- Georgian Legion
- Freedom of Russia Legion
