= Demographic history of Greece =

Agriculture came to Europe from Asia via the Balkans, which were one of the first areas in Europe to experience the Neolithic transformation. As early as 5000 BC the area's Mesolithic population had been transformed into a peasant society of 250,000 people, which in turn grew to 2,000,000 people by the Bronze Age. By then the art of writing had been imported to Greece.

Linear B was used to record accounts, and evident from this was the level of sophistication which most certainly reflected in the population distribution, as 50% of the whole Balkan population lived in Greece, meaning that if 4,000,000 people lived in the Balkans in 1250 BC, 2,000,000 people lived in Greece.

By the time the Dark Ages were ending in Greece, in the 8th century BC, the population was exploding and carried more than half of its share of the Balkan total and over 2,000,000 people in absolute numbers, without mentioning the Greek colonies that had already started being established all over the Eastern Mediterranean, Black Sea, Southern Italy, Anatolia and the Adriatic coast. By the end of the 6th century BC, the population of the Greek mainland had grown to 3,000,000 inhabitants, while the population of the Greek settlements outside the mainland, according to the world history encyclopedia and Marc Cartwright, accounted for 40% of the total Greek populace, or another 2,000,000.

According to Mogens Herman Hansen and his book "The shotgun method : the demography of the ancient Greek city-state culture" by the 4th century BC, the Greek mainland contained a minimum of 4,000,000 people, while the total Greek population, including all the Greek cities throughout the Mediterranean and Black Sea, reached 7,5-10,000,000 people. Hansen's method in calculating the population, is based on the advance and accumulation of archaeological information, both about cities and from surveys of the countryside. The data collected in the Copenhagen Polis Centre's Inventory of Archaic and Classical Poleis are also crucial to the Hansen's calculations. Hansen's method basically involves multiplying the inhabited area of all the cities in the Greek world by the density of population in these inhabited areas and by a factor to reflect the fact that not all Greeks lived in cities.

By 200 AD, and after the fruits of Roman peace had settled in, 6,000,000 people in Asia Minor alone viewed themselves as Greeks of the Roman world. Since then and for the next 15 centuries Anatolia (Asia Minor) would carry the bulk of the Greek population. Another 4,200,000 Greeks lived in the mainland, which was facing significant declination, and there were still about 1,000,000 more Greeks in Southern Italy and Sicily.

After the reign of Emperor Heraclius and the loss of all of its overseas territories, Byzantine territories were limited to the Balkans and Anatolia, both largely Greek-populated areas. When Byzantium began to recover after a series of conflicts in the 8th century and its territories stabilized, its population began to recover. By the end of the 8th century there were 7,000,000 Byzantines, a figure that climbed to 12,000,000 Byzantine Greeks by 1025. The numbers began falling steadily to 9,000,000 Byzantines at 1204. At 1281 with the arrival of the Turks, whose population in Anatolia numbered about 1,000,000 or about 15% of the total Anatolian populace, started the Islamisation, and thus by the standards of the time Turkification, of a very important part of the Greek population.

In 1830, with Greek independence from the Turks, the Greek population was about 5,000,000 (almost one fifth, 750,000, in independent Greece and many in Southern Russia and Ukraine, under the Russian empire, and in the Ionian Islands, under the British Empire, but with the majority still under Ottoman rule).

In 1864 the Ionian Islands joined Greece peacefully and so did Thessaly and Arta in 1881.

In 1911, just before the Balkan Wars and the Greek Genocide, the Greek population numbered about 8,500,000 (2,701,000 in independent Greece, more than 2,000,000 in the European part of the Ottoman Empire and another 3,000,000 in the Asiatic side, with many hundreds of thousands across the Southern Russian empire, Southern Italy, Egypt, Romania, specifically along the Danube, and the Caucasus).

In 1922, after defeat by Turkey and the population exchange which saw 1,250,000 Greeks move across the Aegean (100,000 had departed Eastern Thrace in the decade prior to 1914) the total Greek population was approximately 7,000,000. 400,000 remained in Istanbul. 1,200,000-1,600,000 had been killed during WWI and the Greco-Turkish War of 1922–1923. Most were victims of the Greek Genocide of (1913–1923).

Another tragic event for Greek demographics was WWII, which left Greece completely destroyed. In addition to causing up to 1,1 million deaths (in the civilian population of big cities like Athens and Thessaloniki mostly due to famine and in the countryside mostly due to Italian, Bulgarian and German massacres) and almost wiping out the 70,000 strong Jewish community, the war also left the Greek economy and infrastructure in a deplorable state and caused the 1946-1949 Greek Civil War (which was also particularly bloody). It is also noteworthy that Germany never paid any reparations to Greece for that catastrophe.

In addition to that, the Greek population under Turkish rule would continue to suffer, first with the Septembriana or Istanbul pogrom. At the 6th of September 1955, the Turkish state organized and supported anti-Greek riots all over Istanbul. This damaged the Greek population deeply and it could not manage to withstand its eventual, almost complete, demise after the 1964-5 expulsion of the bulk of the Greek population that had remained in the city according to the 1922 treaty of Lausanne.

Henceforth, the Greek population began to rise steadily in numbers to an all-time high for the peninsula and archipelago of 12,000,000 Greek people in Greece and Cyprus by 2007.

| Year | Population | Regions |
| 1250BC | 1,000,000+ | Greece |
| 600BC | 5,000,000 | Greek mainland and colonies |
| 400BC | 7,5-10,000,000 | Greek mainland and colonies |
| 200 | 11,200,000 | Greece, Anatolia, Magna Grecia |
| 800 | 7,000,000 | Byzantine Empire |
| 1025 | 12,000,000 | Byzantine Empire |
| 1204 | 9,000,000 | Byzantine Empire |
| 1830 | 5,000,000 | Greece, Russian Empire, Ottoman Empire, Mediterranean |
| 1911 | 8,500,000 | Greece, Russian Empire, Ottoman Empire, Mediterranean |
| 1922 | 7,000,000 | Greece, Soviet Union, Constantinople |
| 1955* | 8,000,000 | Greece and Cyprus |

- the numbers of the table do not include Greek immigrants. Greek immigration to places like the US is not accounted for in the chart.
- the 1955 date does not include Greeks outside Greece and Cyprus.

== See also ==
- Demographic history of modern Greece

== Bibliography ==
- Warren Treadgold, "History of the Byzantine State and Society"
- Mcevedy and Jones, "Atlas of world population history"
- Mogens Herman Hansen, "The shotgun method : the demography of the ancient Greek city-state culture"
- Douglas Dukin, "The Unification of Greece 1770-1923"
- Maria Kavala "Η καταστροφή των Εβραίων της Ελλάδας (1941-1944)"
- Elias Venezis "The Number 31328:The Book of Slavery"
