= State Repatriation Office =

Państwowy Urząd Repatriacyjny (abbreviated PUR, translated into English as State Repatriation Office, State Office of Repatriation, National Repatriation Office or National Office of Repatriation) was a Polish communist governmental body created by Polish Committee of National Liberation on 7 October 1944 to oversee the repatriations in Poland. At first, PUR oversaw repatriations of Poles from Kresy, and from 1945, expulsion of Germans from Regained Territories. Also, in 1945, PUR powers were limited, as some it its competences were transferred to the newly created post of the General Representative of the Government for Repatriation (Generalny Pełnomocnik Rządu do spraw Repatriacji).

Managers: Władysław Wolski, Michał Sapieha, Mścisław Olechnowicz.

In the post-World War Two territory of Poland, the PUR had branches in each voivodeship. Furthermore, in the so-called Recovered Territories, it ran regional offices, which covered several powiats. In the first postwar months, these offices were under direct supervision of three voivodeship branches, Poznań, Katowice and Białystok. Most important tasks in postwar transfers of population were carried out by stage offices (punkty etapowe) of the PUR. The biggest one was Special Western Stage Office (Specjalny Punkt Etapowy Zachodni), located in Czechowice-Dziedzice. It serviced some 500,000 people.

There were four kinds of such offices:

- offices located along new eastern border of Poland (see Curzon Line). They provided financial and material help for Polish inhabitants of Kresy Wschodnie, forced to leave their homeland,
- offices located along main rail lines, which provided food and directed transports to their destinations,
- special offices, which handled those rail transports that had to switch from wide gauge into regular gauge track,
- destination offices, in which transports were unloaded, and directed to the designated places of resettlement.

As for August 31, 1945, the PUR had 259 offices of all kinds, scattered across Poland.
