= 2011 Greek census =

2011 Population and Housing Census
- 10–24 May 2011

General information
- Country: Greece

Results
- Total population: 10,815,197 (▼0.88%)
- Most populous region: Attica
- Least populous region: North Aegean

The 2011 Population and Housing Census (Greek: Απογραφή Πληθυσμού-Kατοικιών 2011), branded as 2011 General Censuses (Greek: Γενικές Απογραφές 2011), was a population census in Greece conducted by the Hellenic Statistical Authority on behalf of the Greek state between 10 and 24 May 2011. It was conducted as part of the 2011 European Union census. Its purpose was to enumerate the number of people in the country as well as survey the social characteristics of the population. The census was available in 8 languages other than Greek: English, Albanian, French, Vietnamese, Russian, Arabic, Urdu and Dari.

The final results of the census were announced on 28 December 2012, with a minor correction in 2014. According to final results, the total resident population of Greece was 10,815,197 on census day. There was a margin of error of 2.84%.

== Scope and format ==
The 2011 census was carried out to ascertain the number of people in Greece at the time of the census, the demographic, social, and economic conditions of residents and households, and the stock of buildings available in the country. The census was conducted in a format compliant with European Union regulations. It was the first census in Greece carried out over a number of days, as opposed to a single day; this was so as to make it more convenient for residents to complete the census. It was also the first census to be conducted in accordance with the data protection guidelines of the Hellenic Data Protection Authority (el).

== Results ==
=== Main demographic indicators by region ===
Population pyramid of Greece based in 2011 census data.

Region	Absolute numbers			Sex (%)		Average age		Born in (%)		Marital status (%)				
Region	Total	Male	Female	Male	Female	Rural	Urban	Greece	Abroad	Single	Married	Widowed	Divorced	Other
Attica	3,827,624	1,845,279	1,982,345	48.2	51.8	44.2	41.3	85.63	14.37	40.85	47.06	7.11	4.12	0.86
Central Macedonia	1,881,869	912,577	969,292	48.5	51.5	47.6	39.8	87.17	12.83	38.52	50.36	7.69	2.75	0.67
Thessaly	732,762	362,194	370,568	50.7	49.3	48.5	40.3	92.45	7.55	36.92	52.36	8.23	2.05	0.44
Western Greece	679,796	339,310	340,486	49.9	50.1	45.3	39.6	92.95	7.05	41.13	48.32	7.76	2.30	0.49
Crete	623,065	308,665	314,400	49.5	50.5	43.9	37.8	89.06	10.94	40.31	49.71	6.66	2.68	0.64
Eastern Macedonia and Thrace	608,182	299,643	308,539	49.3	50.7	46.2	39.9	89.36	10.64	35.84	52.93	8.52	2.23	0.49
Peloponnese	577,903	291,777	286,126	50.5	49.5	47.1	41.1	88.53	11.47	37.05	51.50	8.37	2.56	0.52
Central Greece	547,390	277,475	269,915	50.7	49.3	47.5	40.5	90.30	9.70	36.96	51.88	8.40	2.29	0.47
Epirus	336,856	165,775	171,081	49.2	50.8	48.5	39.9	91.18	8.82	36.95	52.47	8.32	1.87	0.39
South Aegean	308,975	155,845	153,130	50.4	49.6	42.2	38.4	85.95	14.05	39.79	50.41	5.84	3.22	0.74
Western Macedonia	283,689	141,779	141,910	50.0	50.0	47.6	39.8	92.29	7.71	36.94	52.71	8.16	1.80	0.39
Ionian Islands	207,855	102,400	105,455	49.3	50.7	44.3	41.7	86.72	13.28	36.89	51.11	7.85	3.41	0.74
North Aegean	199,231	99,984	99,247	50.2	49.8	45.1	40.7	91.71	8.29	37.10	51.04	8.61	2.68	0.56
Total	10,815,197	5,302,703	5,512,494	49.0	51.0	46.2	40.6	88.1	11.9	39.08	49.60	7.59	3.07	0.66
Source: Census 2011 tables A01, A04, and A06.

== See also ==
- 2021 Greek census
- Demographics of Greece
- Demographic history of modern Greece
