= 2021 Polish census =

The results of the Polish census of 2021 (officially, the National Population and Housing Census 2021, Polish: Narodowy Spis Powszechny 2021) were published in 2023. Data was gathered from 1 April to 30 September (the previously planned duration from 1 April to 30 June was extended because of enduring COVID-19 policy). The point of reference for the census was set on 31 March 2021.

Censuses in Poland are conducted every 10 years, the previous census was the Polish census of 2011. The next census will be the Polish census of 2031.

== Religions ==
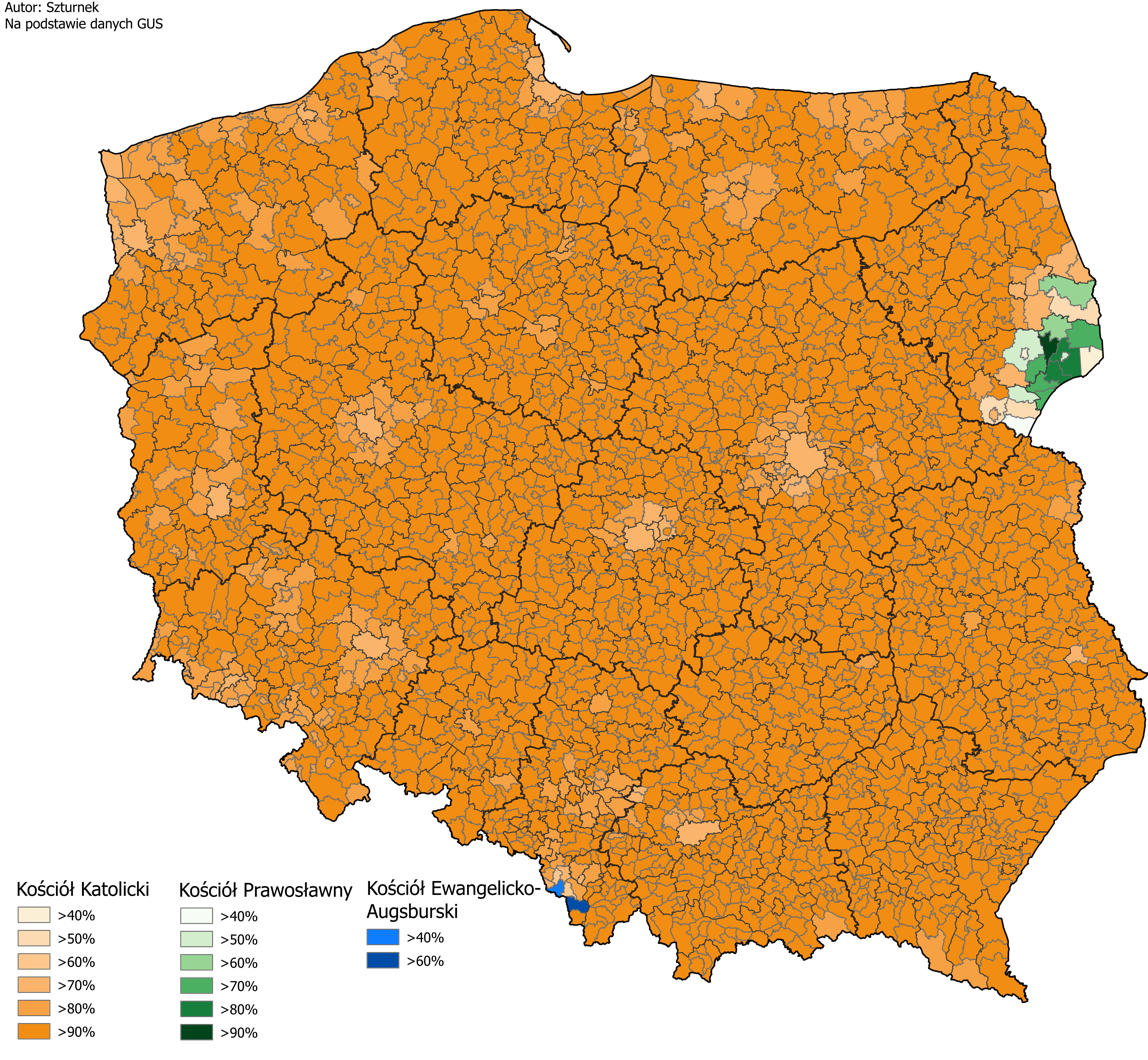
Map of the dominant religion denomination in individual gminas based on census. The percentage refers to people who did not refuse to answer the question about their faith.

The number of declared Catholics decreased to 27.1 million (71%), down from 33.7 million (88%) in the 2011 census.

Population by religious denomination in 2021
Religious affiliation	Percentage (%)
Catholic Church - Latin Rite	71.30
Refused to answer	20.53
Not affiliated with any religion	6.87
Orthodox Church	0.40
Jehovah's Witnesses	0.29
Evangelical Church of the Augsburg Confession	0.17
Catholic Church - Byzantine-Ukrainian Rite (Greek Catholic Church)	0.09
Pentecostal Church	0.08
Old Catholic Mariavite Church	0.03
Christianity (general religious declaration)	0.02
Polish Catholic Church	0.02
Church of Christian Baptists	0.01
Buddhist Union of the Diamond Way of the Karma Kagyu Line	0.01
Seventh-day Adventist Church	0.01
Pastafarianism	0.01
Muslim Religious Association	0.01
Community of Christ Churches	0.01
Native Faith	0.01
Church of God in Christ	0.01
Other religion	0.11
Undetermined	0.04
Total	100.00

== Ethnic groups ==
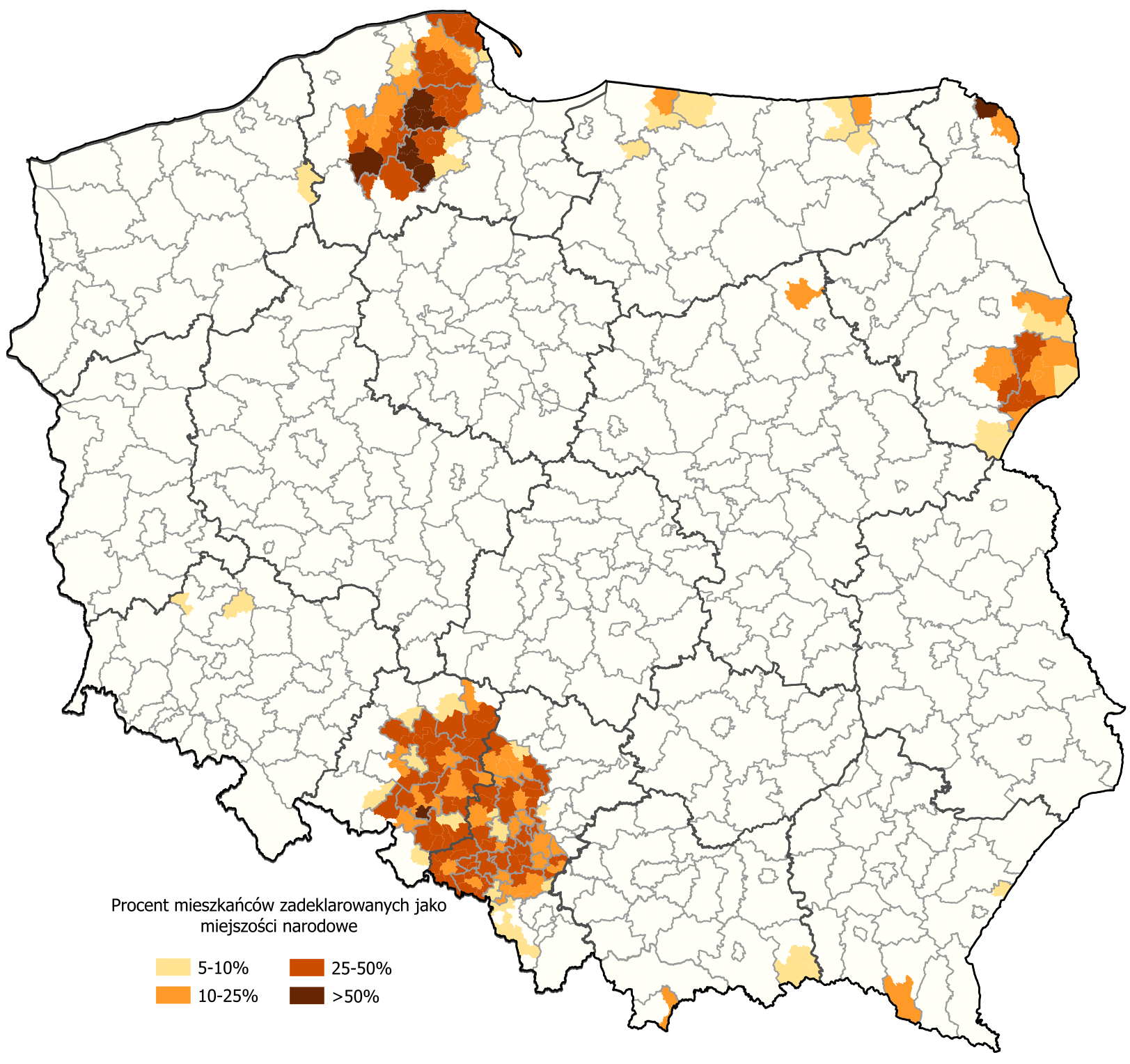
Map of Poland showing areas with at least 5% non-Polish population based on the 2021 Polish census.

The Jewish percentage of the total population of various Polish voivodeships in 2021.

Population by ethnic identification in 2021 (Note: People may declare up to two ethnicities.)
Declared ethnicity	2021
Polish	37,595,069
Silesians	596,224
Kashubians	179,685
Germans	144,177
Ukrainians	82,440
Belarusians	56,607
English	54,424
Americans	27,756
Italians	19,980
Jews	17,156
Russians	15,994
French	14,739
Lemkos	13,607
Romani	13,303
Irish	11,638
Lithuanians	10,287
Dutch	10,254
Norwegian	8,967
Spanish	8,526
Czechs	7,818
Swedes	7,046
Armenians	6,772
Other	140,152

== Languages used at home ==
Population by language used at home, 2021 (Note: People may declare up to two languages.)
Declared language	2021
Polish	37,868,618
English	737,276
Silesian	467,145
German	216,342
Kashubian	89,198
Russian	63,271
Ukrainian	55,104
French	41,895
Italian	38,388
Spanish	29,480
Dutch	17,633
Belarusian	17,325
Norwegian	14,157
Swedish	10,318
Polish Sign Language	9,267
Romani	7,284
Rusyn	6,147
Other	114,479

== See also ==
- Demographics of Poland
