= Ukrainian Social and Cultural Society =

Ukrainian cultural organisation in the Polish People's Republic

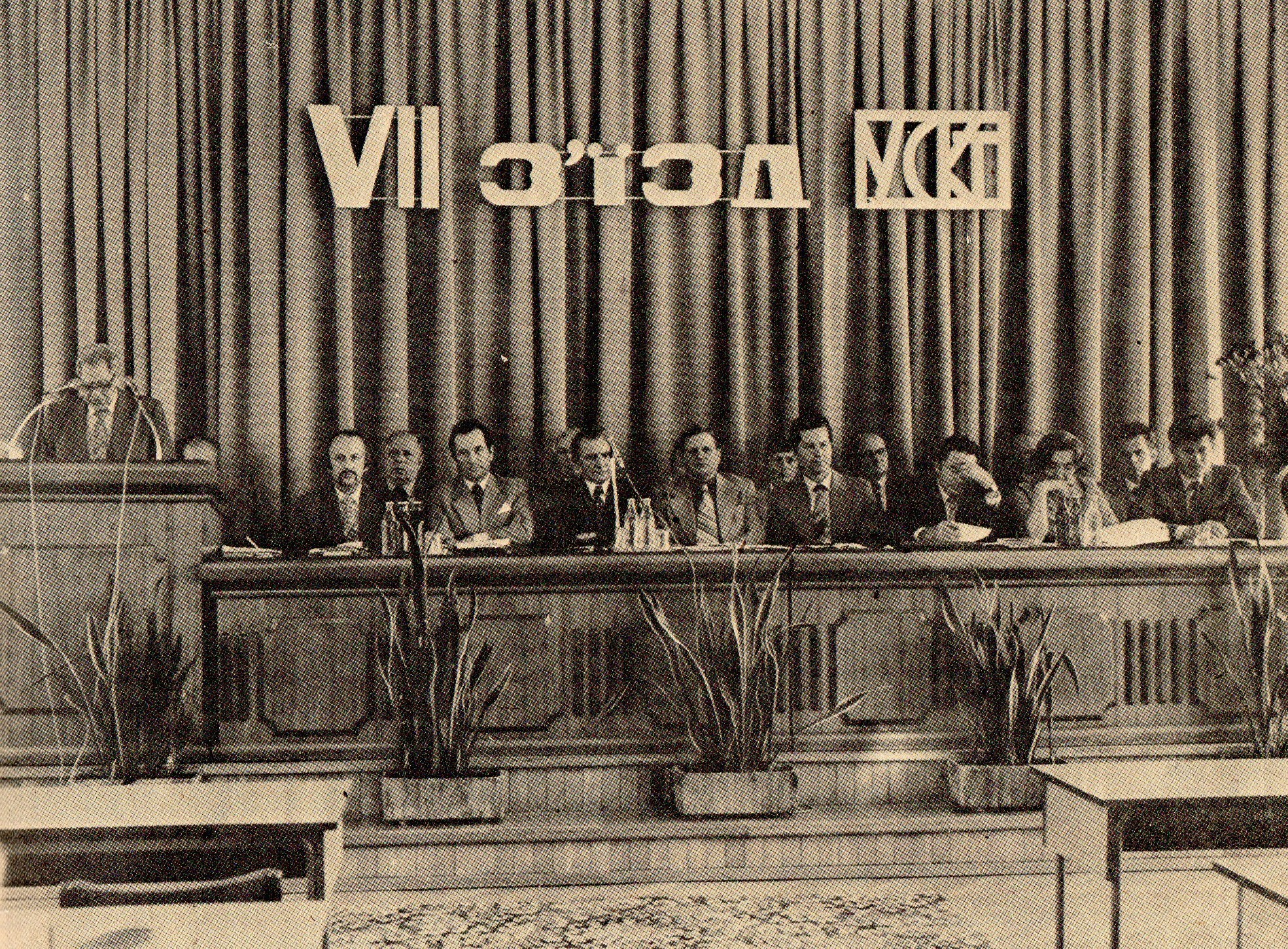
Meeting of the USKT in 1980

The Ukrainian Social and Cultural Society (Polish: Ukraińskie Towarzystwo Społeczno-Kulturalne; Ukrainian: Українське суспільно-культурне товариство, romanized: Ukrainske suspilno-kulturne tovarystvo), abbreviated USKT or UTSK, was a cultural institution of Ukrainians active in the Polish People's Republic from 1956 to 1990.

== History ==
The Ukrainian Social and Cultural Society was established in 1956, following nearly a decade of state marginalisation and discrimination of Ukrainians beginning with the establishment of the Polish People's Republic in 1947. The group was established with the support of the Polish government, which permitted the expression of Ukrainian culture within a controlled framework. Established at the same time was Nashe Slovo, the USKT's official newspaper, and a legalisation of the Ukrainian Greek Catholic Church. These groups, as well as other celebrations of Ukrainian culture, were only allowed outside the areas where most Ukrainians had been deported during Operation Vistula.

Despite being under surveillance by the Ministry of Internal Affairs of Poland, the USKT grew into an active and wide-reaching organisation, including 170 groups together including nearly 6,000 members in 1981. Among the projects of the USKT were preservation of the Lemkos and their dialect of the Ukrainian language, the teaching of Ukrainian in primary and secondary schools throughout Poland, and the development of the arts among ethnically-Ukrainian youth. Despite these projects and their achievements, however, they remained under the strict control of the Polish government, and were barred from supporting a programme for the return of Ukrainian expellees or opening offices in Podlachia and Chełm Land.

With the fall of communism in Poland also came significant changes for the USKT. The organisation's 1990 congress resulted in the removal of communist-era leadership and the restructuring of the USKT into the Union of Ukrainians in Poland.

== Notable members ==
- Mikołaj Siwicki
- Lev Gets
