= 2021 Greek census =

2021 Population and Housing Census
- 2021

General information
- Country: Greece

Results
- Total population: 10,482,487 (▼3.08%)
- Most populous region: Attica
- Least populous region: North Aegean

The 2021 Population and Housing Census (Greek: Απογραφή Πληθυσμού–Kατοικιών 2021) is a census in Greece that was conducted by the Hellenic Statistical Authority as part of the wider 2021 European Union census. As with the 2011 census, it enumerates the number of people in the country and surveys the demographic, economic, and social characteristics of the population, as well as the types of building stock available in the country. The census complies with both European Union and United Nations census guidelines. The full set of results will be available by 31 March 2024.

Smartphone and geolocation technologies were utilized in order to carry out the census. A design competition was launched in September 2018, asking university students to design the census logo, and the winner was announced in 2019.

== Background ==
The 2011 Greek census showed that the percentage of people of Greece had declined by 0.88%, compared to the 2001 Greek census, to 10,815,197 people. This demographic trend is expected to continue if fertility rates remain low, with the Hellenic Statistical Authority estimating the decline of the total population of Greece to 9.7 million by 2050 in that scenario. Similarly, Eurostat estimates that, without migration, the Greek population will decline to 9.3 million by 2050, and to 8.9 million with lower fertility; the main Eurostat scenario projects the country's population as 9.1 million in 2050.

== Results ==
Official results for permanent population were published on 17 March 2023. A total of 10,482,487 people were counted during the census, denoting a 3.1% decline from the population of the 2011 census. Out of the total number of inhabitants, 5,125,977 (48.9% of the total population) were male and 5,356,510 (51.1% of the total population) were female. The census' results per administrative region are the following:

Administrative region	2021 population	2011 population	Percentage of change
Eastern Macedonia and Thrace	562,201	608,182	-7.6%
Central Macedonia	1,795,669	1,880,058	-4.6%
Western Macedonia	254,595	283,689	-10.3%
Epirus	319,991	336,856	-5.0%
Thessaly	688,255	732,762	-6.1%
Ionian Islands	204,532	207,855	-1.6%
Western Greece	648,220	679,796	-4.6%
Central Greece	508,254	547,390	-7.1%
Attica	3,814,064	3,827,624	-0.4%
Peloponnese	539,535	577,903	-6.6%
North Aegean	194,943	199,231	-2.2%
South Aegean	327,820	308,975	+6.1%
Crete	624,408	623,065	+0.2%
Mount Athos (Autonomous administration)	1,746	1,811	-3.6%
Total	10,482,487	10,815,197	-3.1%

== Problems ==
Historically, censuses in Greece have been beset by under-counting issues. The 2021 census reported 10.48 million people, 3.1% less than the 2011 census. It has been argued that the accuracy of the 2021 census is questionable, due to its long duration, the inability of some people to answer it online, some refugees not being counted, the hostility of some people towards the state, land workers not being visited by the census workers and cases of census questionnaires being filled according to information by neighbors.

== See also ==
- 2011 Greek census
- Demographics of Greece
