= 2011 German census =

Logo

The 2011 German census (German: Zensus 2011) was the first common census in the member states of the European Union. The deadline for the survey was Monday, 9 May 2011 (Europatag). The results of the evaluation have been published step by step since May 2013. In Germany, the population figures for the federal government, the Länder and communes as well as results from the building and housing census were announced on 31 May 2013.

== Framework of the European Union ==
=== Prehistory ===
In the past, Member States of the European Union have carried out censuses in self-government, which were difficult to compare with each other due to different catalogs of questions. The different surveying dates and periods also differed significantly. For example, the last census in the Federal Republic of Germany took place in 1987. [1] At the time, Germany was still divided. The last census in the GDR took place in 1981. In Austria, every 10 years has been raised (intermittently), since the census of 2011 is in the time series of the last census of 2001. In 2000/2001 an EU-wide census took place, but Germany and Sweden did not participate . In the future, every ten years Europe-wide censuses are to follow.

=== Objectives ===
Through the common census, various data used by Eurostat, which play an important role in the policy of the European Union, are to have a common basis and be reliable and comparable. For example, the allocation of funding from EU structural funds depends on the demography of a region. The number of inhabitants also plays an important role for a country's vote weight in the Council of Ministers.

With the census, at least from November 2012 complete statistics are to be produced Europe-wide. Individual countries have published an overview of the evaluation just a few months after the census.

=== EU legal foundations ===
EU Regulation 763/2008 of 9 July 2008 obliged the Member States of the European Union to collect data from a fixed catalog of characteristics for the 2011 census. This is intended to make the results comparable across the EU. How the data are collected in the individual Member States is optional.

=== EU guidelines on the topics of the census ===
As the 2011 census is held throughout the European Union, the Community has defined valid criteria for all Member States to obtain comparable data. In Regulation (EC) No 763/2008 of the European Parliament and of the Council of 9 July 2008 on population and housing censuses which was published in the Official Journal of the European Union (edition L218 of 13 August 2008) and entered into force on 2 September of that year. The NUTS and LAU systems are used to define the administrative units. In addition, there is a distinction between derived and non-derived themes in the subject list of the population and the housing.

On the NUTS 3 and LAU 2 levels, personal data such as place of residence, gender, age, family status and nationality are collected from which findings on the total population, households and core families are derived. At national level and with NUTS 1 and NUTS 2, information on education and professional activity is added. The statistics on the dwellings include, among other things, the type of accommodation / dwelling, the inhabitants, the usable area and the year of construction as well as the derived theme of the housing density.

== National census ==
In Germany the Census 2011 was carried out in a register-based procedure.

=== Census covenants ===
With a cabinet decision of 29 August 2006, the then federal government of the CDU / CSU and the SPD decided that Germany would participate in the EU-wide Census 2011 with a register-based procedure

On December 12, 2007, the Census Preparation Act 2011 was announced in the Federal Law Gazette Which entered into force the following day. The preparatory work, which was regulated by this Act, included the setting up of an address and building register as well as the transmission of the addresses of the owner of the apartment. The concrete implementation of the Census 2011 in Germany took place according to the 2011 Census Act, which was announced in the Federal Law Gazette on 15 July 2009 And entered into force the day after. This law defined the deadline (9 May 2011), the survey characteristics (age, sex, school leaving, living space etc.) and the persons liable to pay. In addition, it contained statements on the aggregation of the survey parts and the eradication periods of the auxiliary features. Under this Act, the Federal Government granted the Länder a financial allocation of EUR 250 million on 1 July 2011 to offset the costs.

On 16 July 2010, the Arbeitskreis Census imposed a constitutional complaint against the Census Act (Az 1 BvR 1865/10), which was supported by 13.077 citizens. The Federal Constitutional Court did not accept the appeal by decision of 21 September 2010.

On its own information portal [6] the initiative provides independent information.

=== E register-supported census ===
Unlike previous decades, there was no traditional census, in which all residents were questioned. Instead, most of the data were collected from administrative registers - especially those from municipalities and the Federal Agency for Labor.

=== Surveys ===
In the building and housing census, the owners provided information on their properties, which did not provide administrative data covering the entire area. In the household survey, interviewers identified personal data of residents in randomly selected households. These samples are about 10% of the population. Data on the inhabitants of nursing homes, correctional institutions and other special facilities were collected during the survey of the special areas.

The procedure of the register-based census should lead to equally robust results as a traditional census. At the same time, taxpayers should incur lower costs. While a new census according to the conventional method would have cost an estimated one billion euros, according to the German Institute for Economic Research, the new model costs about 300 million euros. Estimates by the Federal Statistical Office estimated to be about 1.4 billion euros for a traditional census and around 450 million euros for a register-based census. The information portal www.zensus2011.de mentions total costs of €710 million.

==== Building and housing counting ====
All owners or administrators of buildings and apartments received a questionnaire by mail and were obliged to provide true information. The questions concerning the buildings related to the type, the year of construction and the property conditions as well as the heating. In the dwellings, information about the occupants, the owners, the usage and the size were required. The homeowners had to return the questionnaires to the authorities within 14 days, in order to avoid a dunning procedure.

==== Household survey ====
In order to carry out the household survey, the survey sites nationwide cited around 80,000 interviewers. All selected citizens were legally obliged to answer the questions truthfully; In the case of refusal, the order of a compulsory money threatened.

The questionnaire consisted of a total of 46 questions. These were related to nationality, religion, family status, immigration to the Federal Republic, school and vocational training and current professional activity. People who were not members of a public-law religious society could state their faith in the eighth question. This was the only question to be answered voluntarily

==== Survey of special areas ====
The survey of citizens in dormitories and community accommodation took place in a similar way to the household survey. In the non-sensitive special areas, the residents had to state whether a household could be run.

In sensitive institutions, such as prisons, emergency accommodation or psychiatric hospitals, the data on the people living there were indirectly collected with the aid of the facility managers. In order to protect the inhabitants particularly in their precarious situation, the questions were very limited

=== Scientific check ===
Official statistics have tested the new method of the census in the years 2001 to 2003 The Mannheim Center for Surveys, Methods and Analyzes and the chair for Economic and Social Statistics at the University of Trier under the direction of Ralf Münnich dealt with the research of a methodology for the small-scale evaluation of the sample results (small area methods). A sample plan was developed that combines moderate costs and a low level of interviews with high-quality data from the census. For this purpose, new survey methods should be investigated and tested for their practical suitability.

On 14 September 2007, the Federal Minister of the Interior convened a scientific commission to scientifically support and support the census and the evaluation of their data The President of the Council for Social and Economic Data, Gert G. Wagner, professor of economics at the TU Berlin and research director at the DIW Berlin (German Institute for Economic Research), was appointed chairman of the "Census Commission". The task of the Census Commission is to examine the concepts, methods and procedures developed by the Federal, State and Federal Statistical Offices for the Census-based Census 2011, including the supplementary sample, to accompany the relevant implementation work critically and constructively, as well as recommendations for further action .

On January 22, 2009, the Zensus Commission adopted an opinion on the feature catalog in the Cabinet drafting of the Census Ordinance (CensusG2011). In doing so, it explicitly regrets the fact that the EU is compulsorily restricted by the EU Statute and maintains the additional features required by it. A census feature of the language spoken in the household, the scientists consider the integration indicator to be much more meaningful than their religious affiliation. Further required characteristics are number of children per woman, commuter connections, energy source of the heating as well as net-net rent.

=== Criticism ===
==== Privacy policy ====
"Do you want the total coverage?": Protest banner at the old main post office in Leipzig (26 June 2011) Data protectors criticize the extensive collection of personal data by the state without sufficient education of the citizens and fears in the face of possible covetousness in the state and economy an abuse of the sensitive information. Since personal data are gathered from numerous sources without the consent or notification of the data subjects, the data from the reporting offices and authorities would be misused.

This is in breach of the requirements of the 1983 censorship verdict. The data protection authorities also see a problem in the fact that, for example, a central data collection system collects and records, among other things, who has set up an information block. People from witness protection programs, former Nazis and radicals, stalking victims, certain judges or celebrities are affected.

The Federal Statistical Office refers to the so-called prohibition, which excludes the transfer of the collected data to other authorities, and the earliest possible deletion of charac- teristics such as names and addresses. These measures are not sufficient for data protectionists. Even after a distance of personal data from the database, they can re-identify themselves from the "anonymous" data using computers and information from other sources. A true anonymisation is thus not given.

==== Questions about religion ====
The questions about belonging to a religious society and the creed also provide for controversial discussions. According to critics, they go beyond what is required by the EU.

The question 8 (the direction of faith) is voluntary and can only be answered if, in question 7 (religious society), the membership of "no public-law religious society" has been crossed. Thus, a user of the census data could automatically view members of a public-law religious community as followers of the religion, regardless of their actual belief. In addition, Question 8 is not further broken up between other religious world views and non-religious views of the world (e.g., humanism, atheism, pacifism) in the possibility of answering "other religion, faith or belief". The spokesman of the Federal Statistical Office stated in this context: "The consequence of this is that the group of atheists (but also those of the other religions) can not be proven in the censorship results. The results of the census will therefore be that we have information about the large religious currents explicitly listed in the questionnaire, but will not know about the spread of other religions and atheism. "The EU Eurobarometer" Social Values, Science and Technology " In 2005, atheists had previously been recorded as a separate group

==== Interviewers ====
Some surveyors ended their activities prematurely. They criticized the perceived too great workload in the household survey and criticized the unfriendly and repulsive reactions of some citizens who had to be paid.

==== Mishaps ====
In Hamburg and Schleswig-Holstein unjustified warnings against allegedly defaultered house and apartment owners caused anger. In January 2012, 50,000 complaints were sent by order of the Statistical Office for Hamburg and Schleswig-Holstein with the threat of compulsory measures, On which a week later 40,000 had to be declared void due to errors in a commissioned company.

==== Posting permissions ====
With the issuance of the questionnaires, the preliminary questionnaire, as well as the actual building and housing census, an envelope for the reply was enclosed by the statistical offices of the Länder. These envelopes were not postage-free, and a reimbursement of costs was not foreseen under Section 15 (3) of the Bundesstatistikgesetz. In the case of parts of the interviewees, the collection of the posture caused displeasure.

=== Result ===
The population of Germany, which was updated as of December 31, 2011, was subsequently adjusted to 80.3 million on the basis of census results. It is thus about 1.5 million inhabitants lower than the figures reproduced on the basis of the update of the census of 1987 (Federal Republic of Germany including Berlin (West)) and the registry data of the New Federal States of 3 October 1990. This corresponds to an error of 1.9%

A correction of the population update by 31 December 2012 on the basis of the results of the 2011 census is to be made by 5 August 2013. The population level as at 31 March 2013 should be published again on the regular date (15 August 2013)

As a result of the changed relative population shares of the federal states, there will be redistributions for country financings and sales tax distribution for the years 2011 and 2012. In the run-up to the census, the Länder had agreed to limit the additional payments for 2011 to one third and for 2012 to two-thirds. From 2013 onwards the changed population will be fully taken into account.

== Bibliography ==
- Anleitung für die Erhebungsbeauftragten; Statistisches Landesamt
- Mario Martini: Der Zensus 2011 als Problem kommunaler Gleichbehandlung. Duncker & Humblot, Berlin 2011, ISBN 978-3-428-13590-5
