= 2011 Italian census =

The 2011 Italian Census was the fifteenth national population and housing census conducted in Italy. It was carried out by the Italian National Institute of Statistics (ISTAT) as part of the 2010 round of population and housing censuses coordinated across the European Union. The census reference date was 9 October 2011. Before then, a population census has been conducted in Italy every ten years since their unification in 1861. According to the final results, the census recorded a resident population of 59,433,744 people.

== European Union Framework ==
The 2011 Italian Census was conducted within the framework established by the European Union to ensure that population and housing data collected by Member States would be comparable. European regulations required countries to collect census data using a common set of topics and definitions, while allowing flexibility in how data were gathered at the national level. Italy designed its census to comply with these requirements and recommendations given by the Conference of European Statisticians, ensuring consistency with other national censuses carried out during the same census round.

=== Objectives ===
The objectives of the 2011 Italian Census were to establish an accurate count of the resident population and collect information on Italy's demographic, social, economic, and housing conditions. In addition to population totals, the census aimed to document long-term trends related to fertility, mortality, migration, household composition, education, employment, and mobility. Another objective was the revision and alignment of municipal population registers with census results, as required under Italian law. The data produced by the census support public administration, territorial planning, and statistical reporting for both Italy and the European Union.

=== Data collection and design ===
The 2011 census reflected changes in Italy's approach to census data collection while maintaining a complete population count. Questionnaires and surveys were distributed to households listed in municipal population registers, and responses could be submitted through multiple channels, including mail, online systems, and municipal collection centers. Follow-up visits by census enumerators were used for households that did not participate voluntarily. In municipalities with 20,000 or more inhabitants, a combination of short and long questionnaires was used, with sampling applied to certain socio-economic variables to reduce respondent burden and improve overall efficiency.

=== Categories ===
The census collected information on a wide range of topics and demographics, including population structure, citizenship, immigration, place of birth, migration, sex, age, birth and death rates, life expectancy, fertility, household composition, education, employment status, occupation, marriage and divorce, housing characteristics, and commuting patterns. Data were gathered for people living in private households as well as those residing in institutional households such as religious, welfare, and care institutions. Results were produced at multiple geographic levels, including national, regional, municipal, and sub-municipal areas.

=== Data dissemination ===
Census results were and are currently disseminated through a transparent data warehouse managed by ISTAT. Their website provides viewers with tables, graphs, maps, drop-down menus, and dashboards that have specific filters to customize information searching and site navigation. The data warehouse includes final data on population, households, dwellings, education, employment, and commuting. Time series data were also made available to allow comparisons with the previous population censuses.

== Results ==
The 2011 Italian Census recorded a resident population of 59,433,744 people and included demographic data on age, sex, and citizenship at national and sub-municipal levels. This is a 258,181 increase from the previous year. The results included information on household size, composition, private households with foreign residents, as well as data on institutional households. Census findings also covered housing conditions, providing information on the characteristics and use of residential buildings. In addition to this, the census published data on educational attainment and economic activity for residents aged 15 years and over. Information also included specific details on commuting for work or study, including travel time and modes of transport.

=== Notable findings ===
In 2011, the overall population growth rate decreased from the previous year and there were 46,817 more deaths than live births. This data confirms an ongoing imbalance between the birthrate and deathrate, indicating a declining replacement rate. A gradual increase in the average childbearing age and infant mortality may be contributing factors.

Census findings showed that population change during this period was driven largely by migration rather than natural increase. International migration remained a key factor in population growth, while internal migration patterns continued to favor northern and central regions over southern areas. The census also documented a growing rate of older residents and notable differences in age structure between the Italian and foreign citizens. Foreign residents accounted for a significant portion of the population and were considerably younger than Italian citizens on average.
