= 2002 Polish census =

2002 census in Poland

Polish census of 2002 (Polish: Narodowy Spis Powszechny 2002) was a census in Poland taken from 21 May to 8 June 2002.

Censuses in Poland are conducted every 10 years. This census was scheduled to take place between 1998 and 2001 but was postponed because of the continuing transformation (legal reforms, most notoriously the 1997 Constitution and the 1999 administrative reform in Poland) and budgetary reasons. The next census was the 2011 Polish census.

The previous censuses were the 1988 Polish census, 1978 Polish census, 1970 Polish census, 1960 Polish census, 1950 Polish census, the 1931 Polish census and the 1921 Polish census, before which Poland had not yet regained independence and was subject to partitioning.

The first proper, nationwide Polish census was the 1789 Polish census before the two last partitions, although irregular, nationwide records resembling censuses began in 1520.

== Results ==
- 96% of surveyed declared Polish ethnicity; 1,23% other and 2,03% gave no answer.

=== Population by voivodeships ===
| Voivodeship | Population | | |
| Voivodeship | total | urban | rural |
|---|---|---|---|
| Greater Poland | 3,351,915 | 1,934,790 | 1,417,125 |
| Kuyavian-Pomeranian | 2,069,321 | 1,288,519 | 780,802 |
| Lesser Poland | 3,232,408 | 1,626,865 | 1,605,543 |
| Łódź | 2,612,890 | 1,697,745 | 915,145 |
| Lower Silesian | 2,907,212 | 2,076,121 | 831,091 |
| Lublin | 2,199,054 | 1,025,566 | 1,173,488 |
| Lubusz | 1,008,954 | 651,045 | 357,909 |
| Masovian | 5,124,018 | 3,312,618 | 1,811,400 |
| Opole | 1,065,043 | 560,064 | 504,979 |
| Podkarpackie | 2,103,837 | 853,053 | 1,250,784 |
| Podlaskie | 1,208,606 | 711,572 | 497,034 |
| Pomeranian | 2,179,900 | 1,484,838 | 695,062 |
| Silesian | 4,742,874 | 3,751,393 | 991,481 |
| Świętokrzyskie | 1,297,477 | 595,388 | 702,089 |
| Warmian-Masurian | 1,428,357 | 860,229 | 568,128 |
| West Pomeranian | 1,698,214 | 1,180,559 | 517,655 |
| Poland | 38,230,080 | 23,610,365 | 14,619,715 |

=== Significant ethnic minorities ===
In addition to Poles, ethnic groups of more than 25,000 people compose the following:

| Ethnicity | Quantity | Living mostly in |
|---|---|---|
| Silesians | 173,153 | Silesian Voivodeship, Opole Voivodeship |
| Germans | 152,897 | Silesian Voivodeship, Opole Voivodeship |
| Belarusians | 48,737 | Podlaskie Voivodeship |
| Ukrainians | 30,957 | Warmian-Masurian Voivodeship |
| Roma | 12,855 | spread out evenly |
| Russians | 6,103 | Masovian Voivodeship (Warsaw) |
| Lemkos | 5,863 | Lower Silesian Voivodeship |
| Lithuanians | 5,846 | Podlaskie Voivodeship |
| Kashubians | 5,062 | Pomeranian Voivodeship |
| Slovaks | 2,001 | Lesser Poland Voivodeship |
| Vietnamese | 1,808 | Masovian Voivodeship (Warsaw) |
| French | 1,633 | Masovian Voivodeship (Warsaw) |
| American | 1,541 | spread out evenly |
| Greek | 1,404 | spread out evenly |
| Italian | 1,367 | Masovian Voivodeship (Warsaw) |
| Jews | 1,133 | Masovian Voivodeship (Warsaw) |
| Bulgarian | 1,112 | Masovian Voivodeship (Warsaw) |
| Armenians | 1,082 | Masovian Voivodeship (Warsaw) |
| Czechs | 831 | spread out evenly |
| British | 800 | Masovian Voivodeship (Warsaw) |
| Tatars | 495 | majority in Białystok and Trójmiasto |

== See also ==
- Demographics of Poland
