= 2011 Polish census =

The Polish census of 2011 (Polish: Narodowy Spis Powszechny 2011) was a census in Poland taken from 1 April to 30 June 2011.

Censuses in Poland are conducted every 10 years, the previous census was the 2002 Polish census. The next census was the 2021 Polish census.

== Results ==
=== Population by voivodeships ===
| Voivodeship | Population | | |
| Voivodeship | total | urban | rural |
|---|---|---|---|
| Greater Poland | 3,447,441 | 1,925,817 | 1,521,624 |
| Kuyavian-Pomeranian | 2,097,635 | 1,269,821 | 827,814 |
| Lesser Poland | 3,337,471 | 1,640,965 | 1,696,506 |
| Łódź | 2,538,677 | 1,621,763 | 916,914 |
| Lower Silesian | 2,915,241 | 2,037,736 | 877,505 |
| Lublin | 2,175,700 | 1,011,528 | 1,164,172 |
| Lubusz | 1,022,843 | 649,297 | 373,546 |
| Masovian | 5,268,660 | 3,381,717 | 1,886,943 |
| Opole | 1,016,212 | 532,217 | 483,995 |
| Podkarpackie | 2,127,286 | 881,665 | 1,245,621 |
| Podlaskie | 1,202,365 | 724,547 | 477,818 |
| Pomeranian | 2,276,174 | 1,498,272 | 777,902 |
| Silesian | 4,630,366 | 3,601,602 | 1,028,764 |
| Świętokrzyskie | 1,280,721 | 577,842 | 702,879 |
| Warmian-Masurian | 1,452,147 | 863,355 | 588,792 |
| West Pomeranian | 1,722,885 | 1,187,748 | 535,137 |
| Poland | 38,511,824 | 23,405,892 | 15,105,932 |

=== National/ethnic identity ===
The Census included two questions regarding national and ethnic identity:

- What is your nation? ("Jaka jest Pana/Pani narodowość?") The census provided the following definition: "Nationality (national or ethnic affiliation) is a declared (based on subjective feeling) individual feature of the person, which expresses their emotional, cultural or genealogical relationship (due to the origin of parents) with a specific nation".
- Do you feel an affiliation with another nation or ethnic group? ("Czy odczuwa Pan/Pani przynależność także do innego narodu lub wspólnoty etnicznej?")
- 93.8% of surveyed declared Polish ethnicity; 3,8% other and 2,4% gave no answer.
- 99.7% of those surveyed declared Polish citizenship; 0.2% declared other citizenship.

==== Significant ethnic minorities ====
Other ethnic groups in Poland include:

| Ethnicity | 2002 | 2011 (1st declared ethnonationality) | 2011 Total incl. 2nd declared ethn. |
|---|---|---|---|
| Silesians | 173,153 | ~418,000 | ~817,000 |
| Germans | 152,897 | ~59,000 | ~126,000 |
| Belarusians | 48,737 | ~36,000 | ~46,000 |
| Ukrainians | 30,957 | ~37,000 | ~49,000 |
| Roma | 12,855 | ~12,000 | ~16,000 |
| Russians | 6,103 | ~8,000 | ~13,000 |
| Lemkos | 5,863 | ~7,000 | ~10,000 |
| Lithuanians | 5,846 | ~5,000 | ~8,000 |
| Kashubians | 5,062 | ~17,000 | ~229,000 |
| Slovaks | 2,001 | ~2,000 | ~3,000 |
| Vietnamese | 1,808 | ~3,000 | ~4,000 |
| French | 1,633 | ~1,000 | ~7,000 |
| American | 1,541 | ~1,000 | ~11,000 |
| Greek | 1,404 | ~1,000 | ~3,000 |
| Italian | 1,367 | ~2,000 | ~8,000 |
| Jews | 1,055 | ~2,000 | 7,353 |
| Bulgarian | 1,112 | ? | 2,171 |
| Armenians | 1,082 | ~3,000 | ~3,000 |
| Czechs | 831 | ~1,000 | ~3,000 |
| British | 800 | ~2,000 | ~10,000 |
| Tatars | 495 | ? | 1,916 |

== See also ==
- Demographics of Poland
