= Romuald Rajs =

Polish soldier (1913–1949)

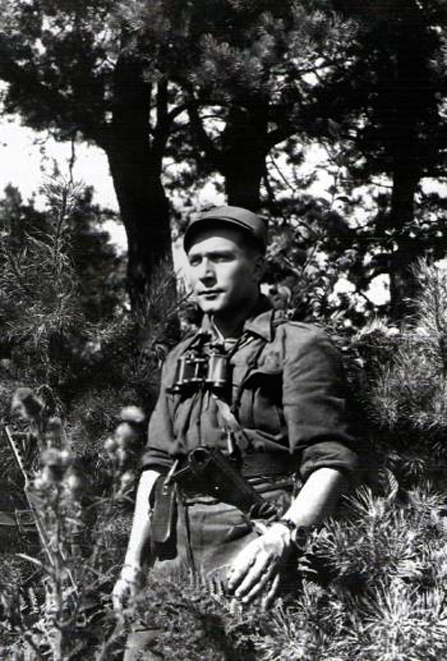
- Rajs in 1943
- Born: 30 November 1913; Jabłonka, Kingdom of Galicia and Lodomeria, Austria-Hungary
- Died: 30 December 1949 (aged 36); Białystok Detention Center, Białystok, Białystok Voivodeship, Republic of Poland
- Cause of death: Execution by shooting
- Military career
- Allegiance: National Military Union
- Nickname: Bury
- Unit: Pogotowie Akcji Specjalnej
- Conflicts: World War II, Polish-Belarusian ethnic conflict
- Awards: Order of Virtuti Militari (Golden Cross); Order of Virtuti Militari (Silver Cross); Cross of Valour; Cross of Merit with Swords (Gold); Cross of Merit (Bronze)

Romuald Rajs, nom de guerre "Bury" (30 November 1913 – 30 December 1949), was a Polish soldier, a member of Home Army (AK) and National Military Union (NZW), an anti-communist insurgent and war criminal. In 1946 the unit under his command burned several Belarusian villages in the region of Białystok and massacred about 79 villagers. He was sentenced to death in a show trial held by the Polish communist government in 1949, charged with membership in delegalized NZW. Following the trial, he was executed in 1949. The verdict was nullified by the Military Court of Warsaw in 1995. In 2005, the Polish Institute of National Remembrance conducted an investigation which revealed that his actions bear the marks of genocide against Orthodox Belarusian community in post-war boundaries of Poland. Rajs is revered by regional nationalist Polish groups as a hero which creates tensions with the local Belarusian and Eastern Orthodox inhabitants.

== Life ==
In 1913, Romuald Adam Rajs was born in the village of Jabłonka, in the Kingdom of Galicia and Lodomeria, Austria-Hungary. In 1934 Rajs graduated from the School for Non-commissioned Officers in Konin and took the parachute course in Biedrusko near Poznań. With the rank of Corporal he was assigned to the 85 Infantry Regiment in Nowa Wilejka, Wilno Voivodeship.

=== World War II ===
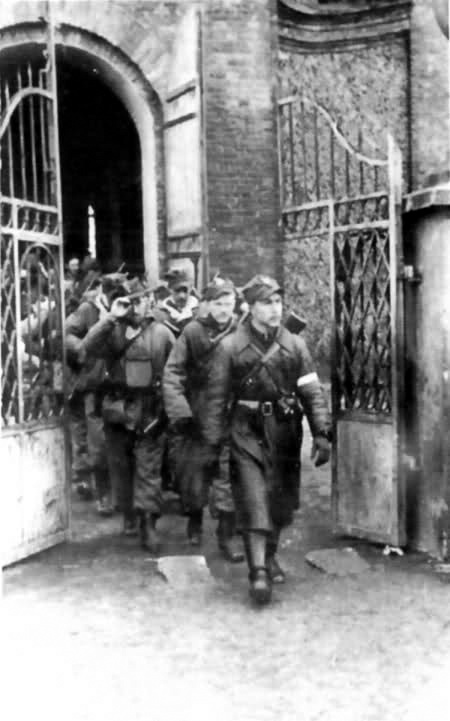
April 1944. Romuald Rajs leads his AK brigade out from Sunday prayer at the Church in Turgiele

In August 1939 his unit was incorporated in the "Prusy" army. During the September campaign his unit was dispersed in the Battle of Tomaszów Mazowiecki and was destroyed by 15 September near Lublin. A few days later, a groups of soldiers led by Rajs was stopped by Belarusians near Kovel and sent to Bereza Kartuska to lay down their arms and horses.

Returning to Vilnius, he joined a Polish underground resistance movement, and in 1942 he submitted to Lieutenant Gracjan Fróg "Góral" of the National Radical Camp (ONR-Falanga). In September 1943 he joined the "Goral" partisan group, which from March 1944 was known as the 3rd Brigade of Vilnius Home Army. Commanding the first assault company, his unit had a reputation for successful combat operations. Rajs led by example, often serving as the lead attacker in his group. He is noted for his successful defense of the village of Mikuliszki during a German manhunt, in which heavy losses were inflicted on the Germans. In July 1944 Rajs took part in Operation Ostra Brama against the Germans. However, he was also known for unscrupulous actions, personally killing prisoners of war.

=== Post-war ===
After the disarmament of the Vilnius brigade by the Soviets on 17 July 1944, he hid out in an estate near Vilnius. At the end of November he joined the communist Polish People's Army, and was assigned to Independent State Forest Protection Battalion and appointed commander of the 2nd Platoon of the 4th Company in Białystok. Two months later he was transferred to Hajnówka, to protect against illegal logging.

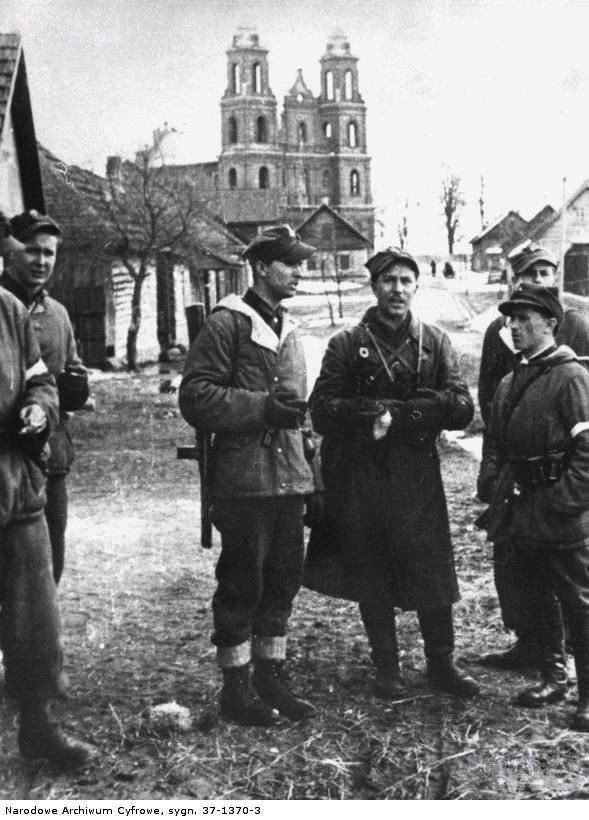
3rd Wilno Brigade in Turgiele. From left: Witold Łukomski "Zorian", Czesław Stankiewicz "Zaskoczek", Wacław Barbarowicz "Baśka", Romuald Rajs "Bury", Józef Surowiak "Bohdan", and Eugeniusz Korejwo "Mat" (1944)

In May 1945 he deserted from the Polish People's Army, and joined Zygmunt Szendzielarz's recreated Home Army 5th Wilno Brigade as a second lieutenant. This Brigade did not comply with the order to disband issued by the Home Army. Commanding the 2nd squadron of the Brigade, he carried out several raids against the communist forces. In September 1945 Szendzielarz disbanded the brigade, but Rajs decided to continue to fight and made contact with Major Jan Szklarek of the NZW. He became head of PAS Special Forces (Pogotowie Akcji Specjalnej) within NZW Białystok.

The NZW's goal was the liberation of Poland from Soviet rule, with a national-Catholic character. Rajs pushed for action, and in particular ruthless action against the soldiers of the Polish People's Army and the local Belarusian population. However, following pacification of the district by the communists, he demobilized the unit in October and went to visit his wife near Warsaw. He returned to Białystok in January 1946, and took command of the 120 soldiers of the 3rd Vilnius Brigade of the NZW.

=== War crimes ===
In January and February 1946, Rajs' unit "pacified" six Belarusian villages, murdering 79-87 civilians and wounding dozens. In Zaleszany his men locked civilians in a building and then burned them alive.

While the motivation for these actions is not entirely clear, it is known that it was not accidental. During January 1946 Rajs' unit captured forty horse cart drivers near Łozice. Those drivers who declared themselves Polish were released, while the remaining 29 were shot near Puchały Stare. The unit then went on a genocidal rampage in the villages of Zaleszany, Wólka Wygonowska, Zanie, Szpaki, Końcowizna, Popówka, Rajska, Sypnie, and Potoka, killing an additional 50 people. These killings were condemned by the NZW itself, which intended to court-martial Rajs, however this ultimately did not happen.

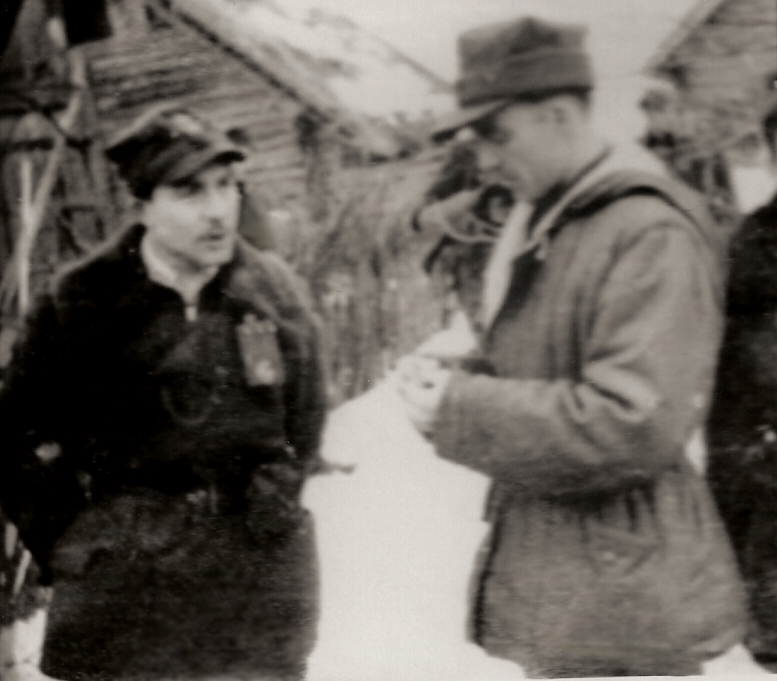
Rajs (left) in a meeting with Lieutenant Piotr Motylewicz, special-operations paratrooper from the Silent Unseen (1944)

The activity of PAS-NSW, under the command of Rajs, against the ethnic Belarusians in the region of Białystok encouraged many Belarusians to view the communist government as less hostile to them than the Polish underground.

In April 1946 he ordered the murder of over a dozen captured Public Security and Milicja Obywatelska personnel.

=== Arrest and execution ===
From August 1946 Rajs's brigade was dispersed, and divided into small teams. In October 1946 Rajs disbanded the brigade, and went to his family in Elbląg. In November 1948 he was detained, and though he managed to escape, was later captured again. Rajs attempted to collaborate with the communists, and provided information on the structure of anti-partisan underground. However, the communists put him on trial. Rajs was found guilty of massacring Belarusian civilians and sentenced to death by shooting. He was executed in late 1949.

== Memory in post-communist era ==
In 1995, the Warsaw District Military Court annulled the 1949 death sentence, as his actions were seen by the court as under the circumstances of force majeure. However, in the opinion of Belarusians this was the rehabilitation of a murderer. In March 1997 relatives of Rajs' victims appealed to the Białystok court to overturn this verdict. The initial inquiry that was launched that determined that the victims were not involved in the structure of the communist state and that therefore Rajs' crimes were classified as crimes against humanity. In 2002 this case was taken over by the newly formed Institute of National Remembrance (IPN), whose local prosecutor collected evidence which showed that the motivation for the crimes was ethnic hatred. However, the investigation into these crimes was closed in 2005 on the grounds that perpetrators were deceased. In closing the case in 2005, the IPN stated that "it must be stated categorically that the murder of [Belarusian] wagon-drivers and the pacification of [Belarusian] villages in January–February 1946 cannot be seen as part of the battle for an independent state, since they bear the marks of genocide". This recognition by the IPN of the crimes of a cursed soldier against national minorities was exceptional.

Rajs remained relatively obscure until his memory was taken over by the National Radical Camp (ONR), a nationalist group, which actively promotes him as a hero. Since 2015 posters of Rajs are displayed in Independence day marches by the group's supporters. Along the border with Belarus, glorification of Rajs has become a way to express anti-Belarusian sentiments. During late 2015, the ONR placed his name on several public and private buildings in which Belarusians live in Hajnówka and elsewhere. Since 2016, a march to commemorate Rajs is held by ONR in the town. While Rajs is promoted by Polish nationalists, he is repudiated by the Belarusian minority in Poland and Polish mass media.
