= Monument to World War II Orthodox victims, Białystok =

Monument to World War II Orthodox victims in Białystok
- Pomnik prawosławnych ofiar II Wojny Światowej
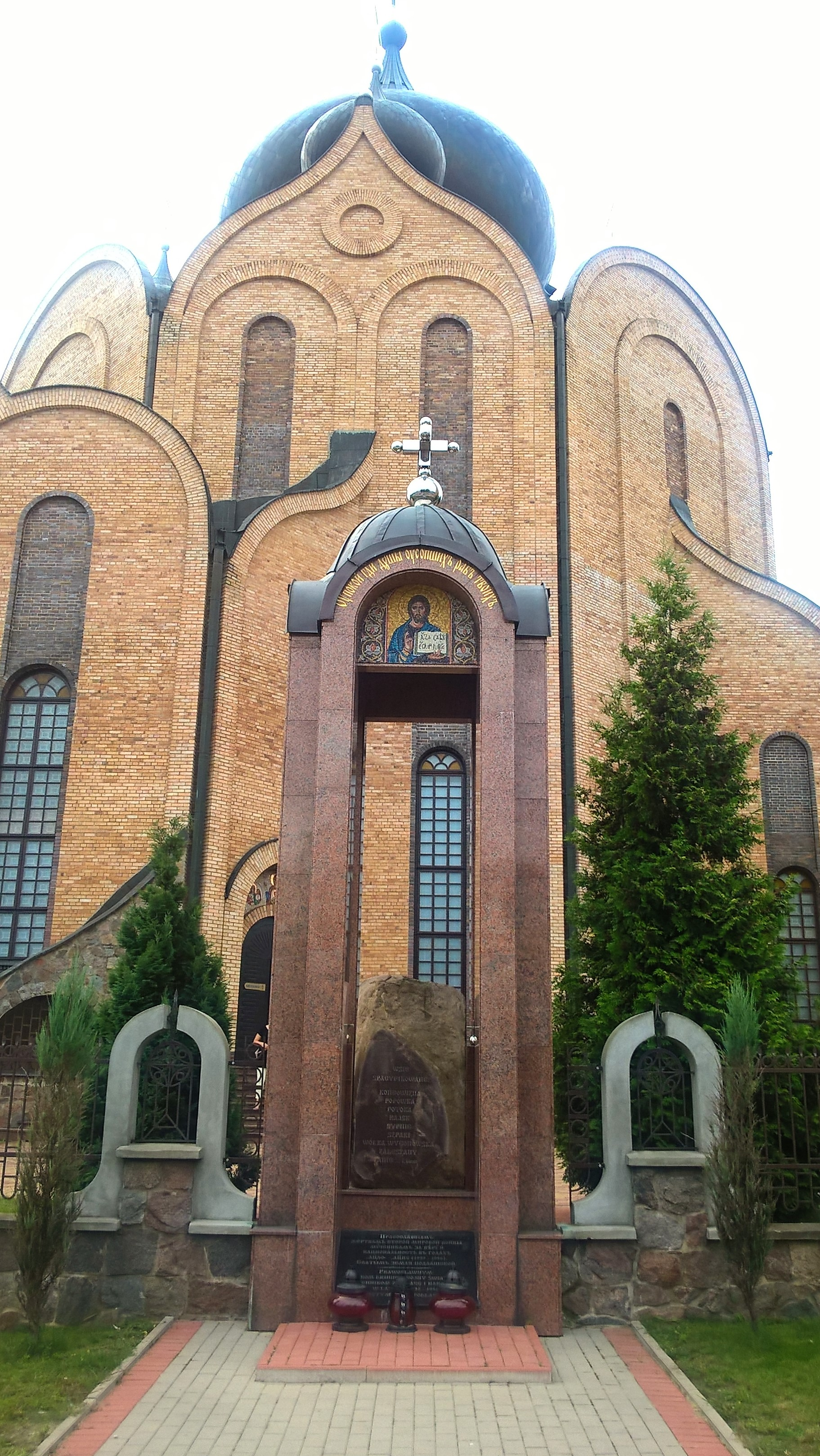
- The monument, with Orthodox church in the background
- Interactive map of Monument to World War II Orthodox victims in Białystok
- Location: Białystok
- Coordinates: 53°08′48.2″N 23°07′17.9″E
- Beginning date: 2009
- Completion date: 2012
- Dedicated to: Orthodox Christians of Podlachia

The Monument to World War II Orthodox victims in Białystok (Polish: "Pomnik prawosławnych ofiar II Wojny Światowej'') is a privately funded memorial commemorating the memory of 5,000 Orthodox Christians from the Białystok region who perished in World War II and during the postwar repressions in Stalinist Poland.

== History ==
The monument was unveiled in 2012 adjacent to the Eastern Orthodox Church of the Holy Spirit in Białystok, the largest Orthodox church in Poland. The monument is placed in the wall surrounding the church, and features a memorial plaque written in two languages, reading: "To Orthodox victims of World War II, martyrs for faith and nationality in the years 1939–1956. The saints of Podlachia." ("Prawosławnym ofiarom II wojny światowej, męczennikom za wiarę i narodowość w latach 1939-1956. Świętym Ziemi Podlaskiej"). There is a boulder built into the monument, listing names of villages pacified in 1946 during the anticommunist insurrection – no other locations of wartime atrocities or categories of victims are mentioned. The memorial was built with private donations from the parishioners, at the cost of 70,000 Polish złoty. The centrepiece boulder lists mainly villages pacified by cursed soldiers from PAS NZW; inhabited by Christians and non-Christians of ethnic Belarusian background including: Końcowizna, Popówka, Potoka, Sypnie, Szpaki, Wólka Wygonowska, Zaleszany, and Zanie and village of Rajsk destroyed by Nazi occupants (SS and Ordnungspolizei).

== See also ==
- 1946 pacification of villages by PAS NZW
