= Mass killings of Belarusians in Podlachia 1946 =

Massacre of Belarusians in Poland

Massacre of Belarusians in Podlachia 1946
- Part of Anti-communist resistance in Poland (1944–46) and Polish-Belarusian ethnic conflict
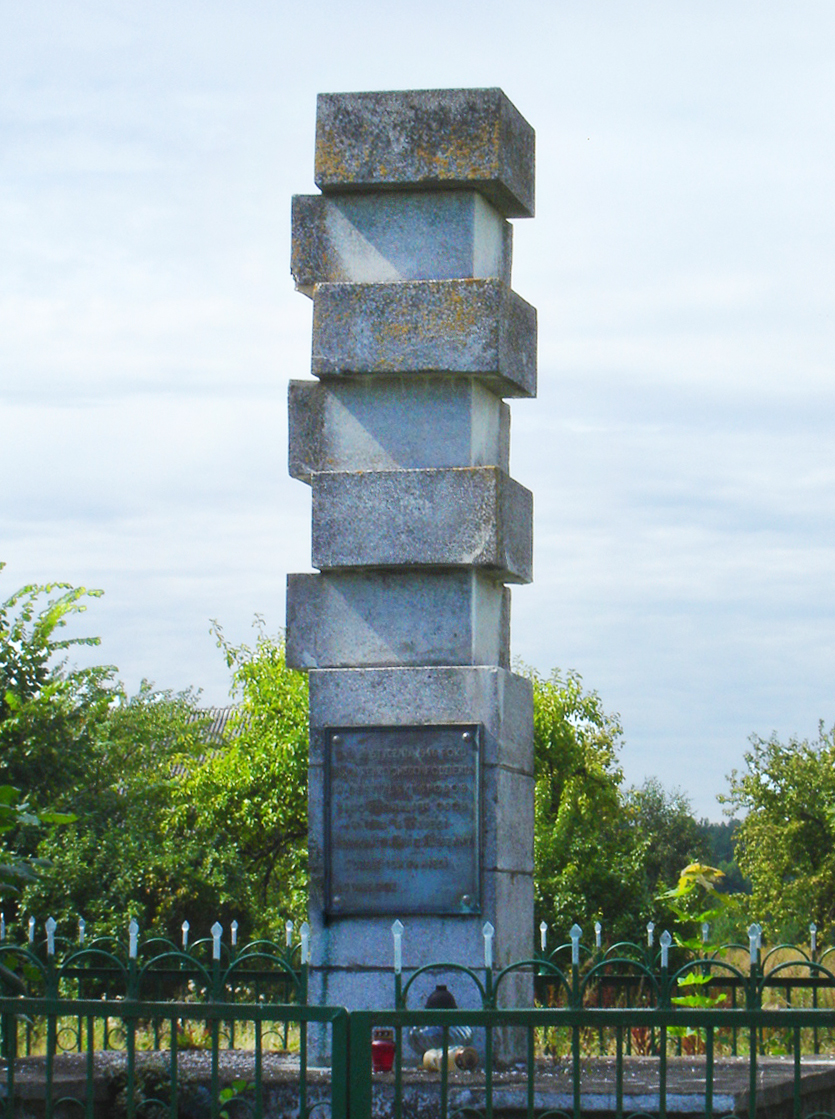
- Memorial to the victims of the genocide in Zaleszany
- Location: Białystok Voivodeship
- Date: January 28, 1946– February 2, 1946
- Deaths: 79–87
- Perpetrator: National Military Union
- Charges: membership in AK and NZW, assassination of MO functionaries, assaults on the Polish and Soviet Army, attacks on the UB security outposts, killings of civilians, possession of assault weapons
- Convicted: Captain Romuald Rajs; Lieutenant Kazimierz Chmielowski

In the aftermath of World War II, between 79 and 87 Polish nationals of Belarusian ethnicity were killed in Białystok Voivodeship, north-eastern Poland, by partisans, members of the Polish Extraordinary Special Actions unit of the National Military Union (Polish: Pogotowie Akcji Specjalnej Narodowego Zjednoczenia Wojskowego).

In January and February 1946, units of the PAS Special Forces burned down the villages of Zaleszany, Wólka Wygonowska, Zanie, Szpaki, and Końcowizna. They also executed 30 coachmen on 30 January 1945 near Puchały Stare, and a similar number of armed resistors in Zanie on 2 February 1946.

Since 1995, the killing of civilians was the subject of official investigation by the government-affiliated Institute of National Remembrance (IPN). The inquiry resulted in the publication of a final report in June 2005, summarizing the case. The Commission interviewed a total of 169 persons, and analysed all documents and testimonies dating back to the 1949 show trial of Polish cursed soldiers: Captain Romuald Rajs of the PAS Special Forces, and his co-conspirator and deputy, Lieutenant Kazimierz Chmielowski from NZW.

Among the individuals questioned by the IPN were families of victims, as well as former soldiers of the 3rd Brigade of NZW. The IPN closed its official investigation without additional charges filed. Sentences from the Stalinist period had already been carried out. In addition, there had been extrajudicial killings of partisans by governmental authorities during the Polish anti-Communist insurrection. No living perpetrators of the atrocities committed in early 1946 have been identified. The postwar atrocities have continued to receive considerable press coverage by the media.

== Background ==
In November 1944, the National Military Union (Narodowe Zjednoczenie Wojskowe, NZW) was formed out of the National Armed Forces (NSZ) and a portion of the National Military Organization (NOW) which left the largest Polish anti-Nazi organization, the Home Army. The Home Army was disbanded entirely by the order of Gen. Leopold Okulicki on 18 January 1945, due to the Soviet takeover of Poland. Thousands of partisans and underground soldiers were arrested by the NKVD and sent to Soviet Gulag camps. Okulicki was murdered in Moscow.

The annexation of eastern half of the Second Polish Republic by Joseph Stalin was ratified by the new communist authorities in postwar Poland on 16 August 1945, which was followed by mass expulsions of Poles and Belarusians across the new borders.

Mayor Zygmunt Szendzielarz refused to surrender; and recreated the already disassembled Polish 5th Wilno Brigade of Home Army in order to oppose the Soviet occupation of Podlachia (Podlasie) and the Białystok region. Equipped with machine guns and machine pistols, his brigade fought a successful battle with the advancing Red Army and the pro-Soviet Polish People's Army around Miodusy-Dworaki village in Siemiatycze County on 18 August 1945.

Captain Rajs (Bury) was active in the area of Wilno during the German occupation of Poland. Since 1943, he led the 1st Company of the 3rd Wilno Brigade of Home Army with the rank of Second Lieutenant. After the dissolution of the 5th Brigade, Rajs made contact with Commandant of the National Military Union Okręg III Białystok, Major Jan Szklarek, and moved his LWP platoon under his command. He was promoted to the rank of Captain and became leader of the PAS Special Forces (Pogotowie Akcji Specjalnej) within NZW Białystok. The process of unification of smaller underground units in the area of Wysokie Mazowieckie County, commanded by Kazimierz Chmielowski ("Rekin"; meaning "Shark", in Polish) until December 1945, resulted in the gathering of the largest anti-Soviet partisan group in the region.

== Assaults of January and February 1946 ==
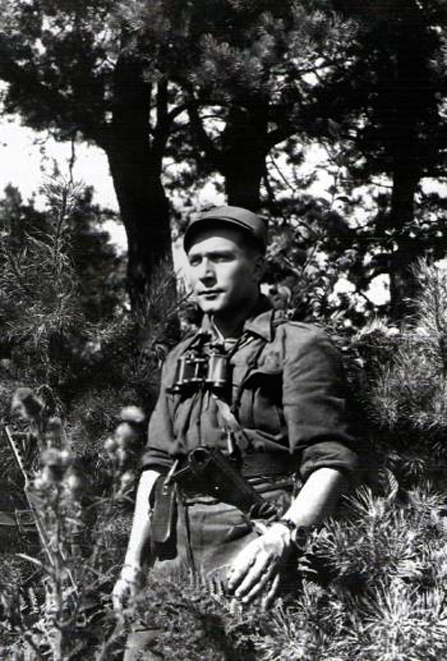
Captain Romuald Rajs

By the end of 1945, the NZW III Białystok consolidated most of the local anti-communist underground by absorbing into its own command scattered units of NSZ and NOW. Many former members of resistance left the forest to begin a new life, although for some the return to civilian life was not possible. Both MO and the NKVD had compiled hit lists of anti-communist conspirators from local sources.

By early 1946, the NZW was the only underground organization still capable of active resistance. Their assaults included destruction of MO outposts and Communist Party bureaus, ambushes on special units of UBP, KBW, WP and NKWD; as well as various retaliatory actions. A few local towns were taken over by PAS NZW temporarily. Some police stations were destroyed repeatedly.

In early January 1946, NZW headquarters called a meeting of local commanders. Rajs was given leadership of partisans enrolled by Chmielowski ("Rekin"). His unit, consisting of 228 soldiers, was renamed as the 3rd Wilno Brigade of the NZW PAS. A decision was made to move the entire force to an area around Bielsk Podlaski for further military training.

=== Actions in Łozice and Hajnówka ===
On 27 January 1946 the battalion entered Łozice village and approached a gathering of horse-drawn vehicles organized by the local authorities in need of conscripted labour. The partisans requisitioned around 40 carriages and ordered their drivers to go along. Some coachmen mistakenly believed that the uniformed soldiers have belonged to the communist forces. The battalion boarded the carriages and in the same evening rode to the County of Hajnówka. Rajs ordered the attack on Hajnówka where the Polish communist militia as well as some Red Army soldiers returning to the USSR, were stationed. The takeover of Hajnówka was unsuccessful. The farmers with horse-drawn carriages remained with the battalion throughout January as means of transportation even though several failed attempts were made by PAS NZW to replace them with new carriers.

Contrary to opinions disseminated by politicized media in today's Belarus, the single criterion used by PAS NZW in the selection of carriages was their durability and strength; it was not the alleged faith of the actual coachmen, nor their purported Belarusian roots, as revealed by research conducted by the Polish Institute of National Remembrance. The coachmen came to Łozice from about a dozen neighbouring villages because they were ordered to do so by the communist authorities attempting to transport nationalised wood to Orla village. Meanwhile, the relocation of the NZW battalion was planned well ahead.

=== Pacification of Zaleszany and Wólka Wygonowska ===
On 29 January 1946 the battalion arrived in Zaleszany, to feed the horses. During a routine document check by the partisans, a Red Army soldier and NKVD informer, Aleksander Zielinko was identified, serving as Communist Party secretary in nearby Suchowolce. All inhabitants were ordered to report to a big house of Dymitr Sacharczuk where they were taken hostage. They were questioned on the whereabouts of suspected collaborator, and sołtys of Zaleszany, Łukasz Demianiuk who vanished. His 16-year-old son Piotr (already a PPR member) was identified and executed together with Zielinko. Not a single hostage was killed from the gathering at Sacharczuk's house. According to official report released in 2005 by the IPN, all hostages kept in Sacharczuk's house ran out to safety and survived; they were not persecuted, but the PAS NZW set a number of buildings on fire, and 16 people died in Zaleszany while attempting to hide from the soldiers. The final IPN investigation revealed that the later description of what happened there was falsified by the Stalinist functionaries.

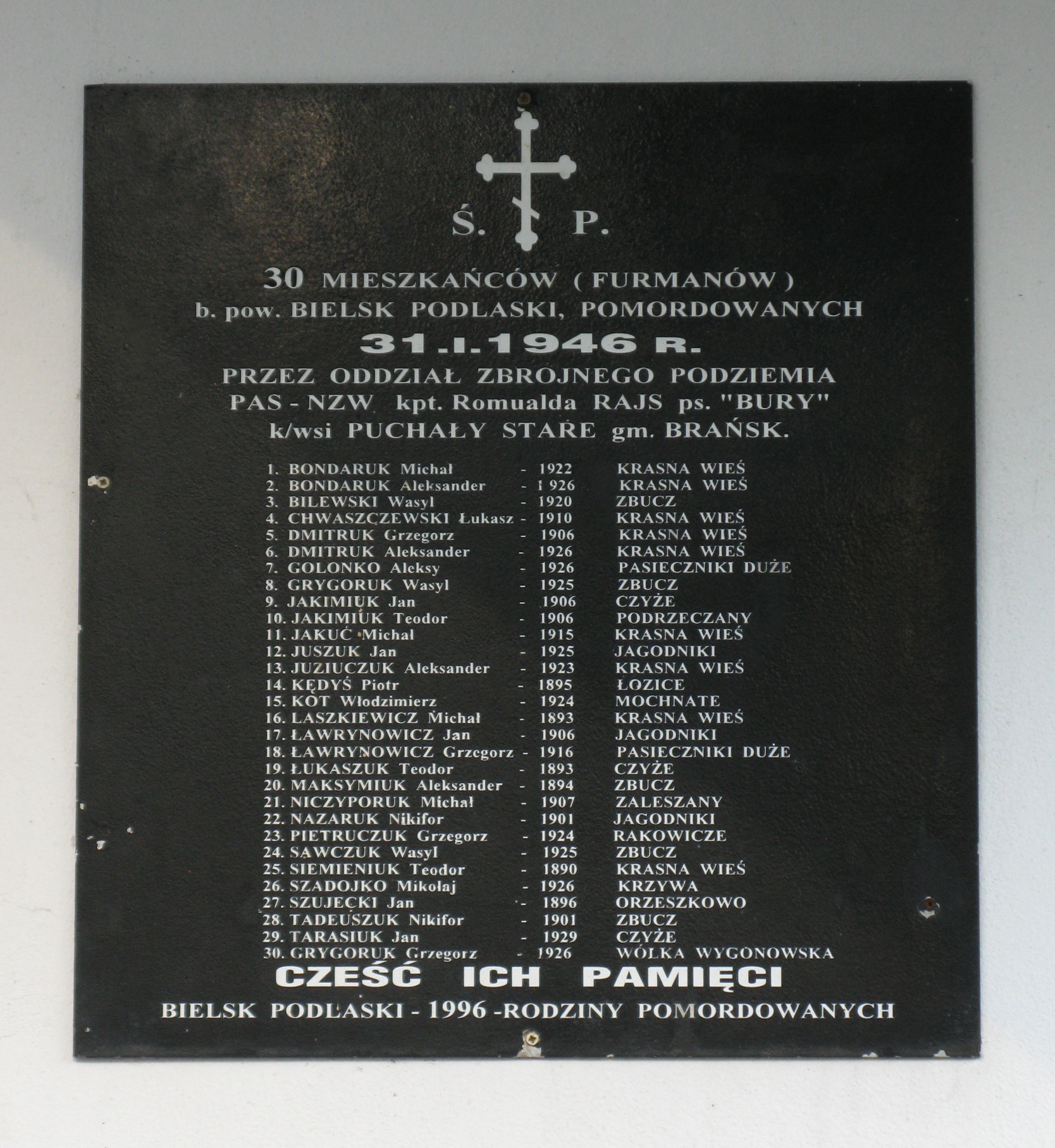
Memorial plaque in Wólka Wygonowska

The unit led by Rajs departed for the neighbouring village of Wólka Wygonowska. Some farm buildings were set ablaze for refusal to provide assistance. Two local men were shot dead while they were running away from the soldiers: Jan Zinkiewicz and Stefan Babulewicz. Many year later, Zinkiewicz's daughter rationalized that her father ran to save his farm equipment from burning, and that he was not fleeing from them.

=== Massacre in Puchały Stare ===
On the following day of 30 January 1946 the command of NZW PAS Brigade arrived in Krasna Wieś village where they arranged the exchange of horse-drawn carriers. Eye-witness Włodzimierz K. from Jagodniki later testified that they arrived in Krasna Wieś ahead of others. Most of the partisan group fell behind. The new coachmen were ordered to wait for them but instead, took their horse-drawn carriages and run away. They were chased through the forest by the platoon led by "Modrzew", caught around Puchały Stare village, arrested, taken away in two groups, and executed as traitors. Years later, the exhumations conducted by the authorities in Puchały on 27 April 1951 revealed that 27 farmers have been killed there and buried in two shallow graves. In 1997 the number was raised to 30. The subsequent 2005 investigation by IPN revealed – based on new evidence – that purported eye-witness of the massacre, Prokop Iwacik, lied in his postwar testimonies, because he could not have possibly been there. Officer "Modrzew" ("Larch" in English) was killed on 16 February 1946; and his true identity remains unknown.

=== Assault on Szpaki–Zanie ===
At the end of January 1946 the soldiers of the 3rd Brigade came to Zanie, Podlaskie Voivodeship, to requisition food. One of the partisans, Kazimierz Borkowski, was struck with an axe to the head by a farmer who refused to give in. Rajs, who had already received information in Hajnówka, that ethnic Belarusians who lived in Szpaki–Zanie served as Volksdeutsche under Nazi Germany, gave an order for the "pacification" of the two villages. During his postwar interrogations Rajs informed that the actual order of burning down Zanie, Szpaki and Końcowizna in retaliation for hostile attitude towards NZW, came from his superior Florian Lewicki nom de guerre "Lis" ("Kotwicz"), regional commandant of NZW (real name, Jan Szklarek). The NZW PAS unit consisting of three platoons of about 30 men led by "Rekin" (Chmielowski), "Wiarus", and "Bitny" (J. Boguszewski), was sent to Szpaki–Zanie on 2 February 1946. Rajs was not present. He went with his command to Końcowizna village, where no-one was killed. According to postwar interrogation of Kazimierz Chmielowski ("Rekin"), the NZW troops were fired upon by the locals in Zanie. Later report by the Special Commission from Bielsk Podlaski confirmed that a submachine gun with ammunition was found in one of the burned out buildings. A dozen farmhouses were set on fire and 36 men singled out for collaboration with the enemy were executed by the platoon led by "Rekin". The names of the men to be shot have been secretly obtained by the Armia Krajowa Obywatelska from Bielsk County. Subsequently, both "Wiarus" and "Bitny" (along with "Modrzew") were killed in action on 12 February 1946 in Gmina Ełk.

Chmielowski ("Rekin") is said to have attacked other villages in gmina Kleszczele as well, where some farmhouses where burned. According to Rajs, Chmielowski did it on his own accord, although Chmielowski himself insisted during questioning by the communist interrogators that bullets were fired up into the air. Notably, as many as five alleged pacification actions by "Rekin" were fabricated by the UB interrogators, since the village of Mostek never existed in the Bielsk County as revealed by the IPN investigation.

== Trial ==
On 17 November 1948, Romuald Rajs was captured in Karpacz by Urząd Bezpieczeństwa while on vacation. A month later, his co-conspirator Chmielowski was arrested on 13 December 1948. They were tried in a show trial held at the Białystok movie theatre "Ton", and charged with membership in AK and NZW aiming to overthrow the communist government of Poland, coupled with armed assaults on the Polish Army and the Red Army, the assassination of MO functionaries, attacks on the UB security outposts, the railway guard, as well as assassination of civilians during forced requisitions of property, and possession of assault weapons. Individually, Romuald Rajs was also charged with desertion from the Polish Army. They were executed on 30 December 1949 without material evidence of alleged civilian atrocities, which were obtained by the communist authorities well over a year later, in the spring of 1951. Rajs denied his guilt of the massacres. He was executed on 30 December 1949 in the Białystok prison at the age of 36. Lieutenant Kazimierz Chmielowski was executed on 1 April 1950.

== Commemoration ==
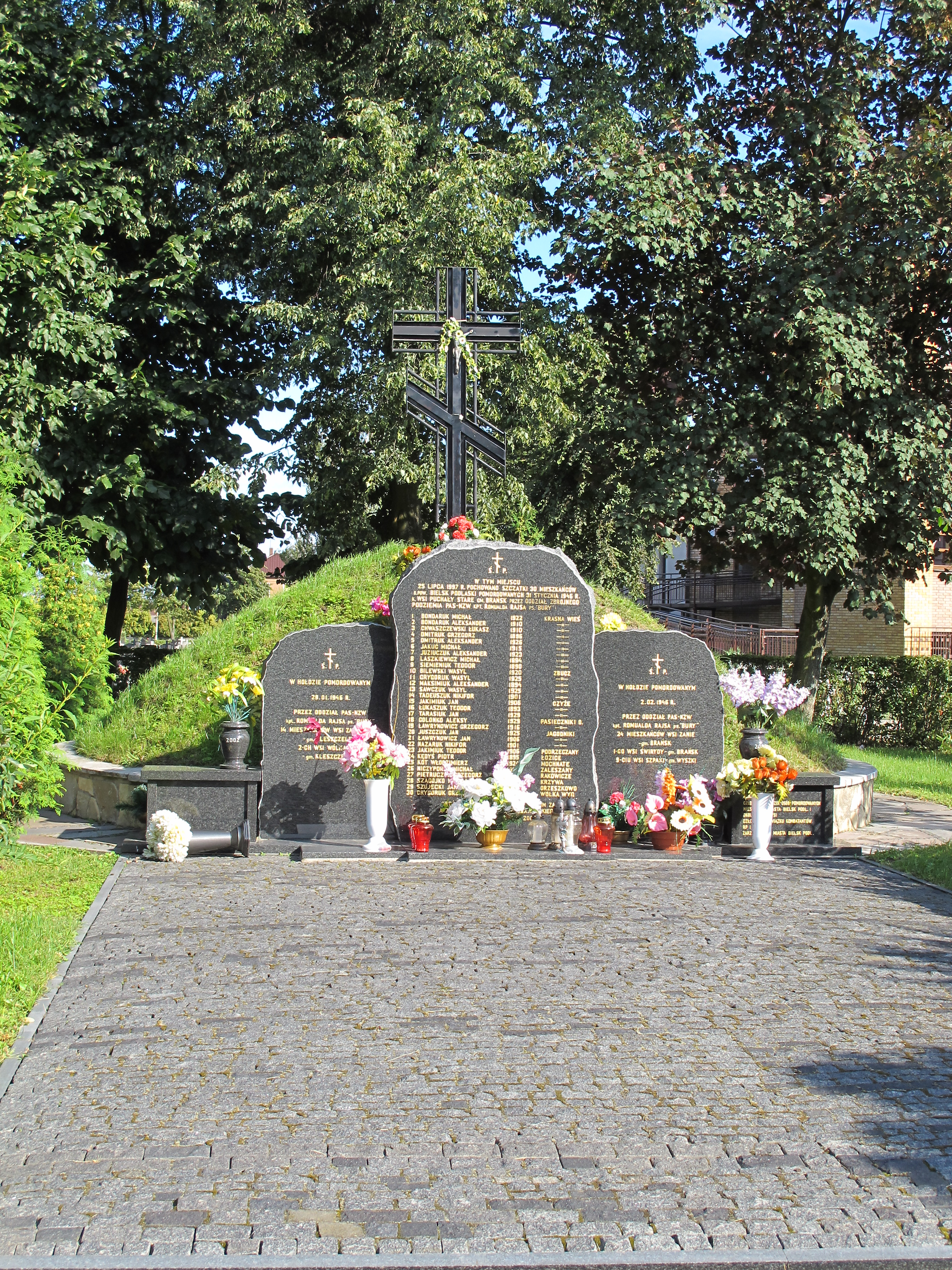
Memorial and tomb of the murdered coachmen in Bielsk-Podlaski

In 1970, a memorial plate was installed in Zanie to commemorate the victims of the massacre. The burial place of most of the victims were not confirmed until the 1951 exhumations. Three more bodies were identified by the IPN pathologists in 1997. After the fall of communism, a Committee of the murdered coachmen family members was created, the victims' remains were reburied in Bielsk Podlaski.

Official commemoration ceremonies are being held at anniversaries of the tragedy in Zaleszczany and Bielsk Podlaski. Leaders of the Belarusian minority in Poland view the 1946 massacre as an important traumatic event in post-war history. According to Oleg Latyszonek, a Polish historian of Belarusian ancestry, the massacre led to the Belarusian minority growing more loyal to the Polish communist regime of that time. Some journalists have commented that Polish nationalists attempt to rehabilitate Romuald Rajs as a part of promotion of suppression and continuous abuse of Human Rights, by the right-wing governments, of the Kaczynski brothers. In 1995, the Military Court of Warsaw nullified the 1948 death penalty given to Rajs. His family received a compensation from the Polish state. On February 2, 2012, on the anniversary of the 1946 massacre, the Polish Sejm has introduced a Day of Commemoration of the Cursed soldiers on 1 March. The families of the victims of the massacre have not received any compensations.

A thriller by Polish novelist, Katarzyna Bonda – who has Belarusian roots – titled Okularnik ("Specky"), part of her detective series about a fictional profiler Sasza Załuska in today's Poland, is inspired by the 1946 Massacres of villages in Podlachia. Her grandmother, Katarzyna, for whom she is named, was murdered by Poles during a massacre in Hajnówka. Bonda's parents told her that her grandmother was killed by the Germans in an effort to protect their family from abuse from the ethnic Poles in the town. The book received considerable coverage by the media in Belarus without being translated into Belarusian.

In 2012, the Monument to Orthodox inhabitants of Białystok who were killed and went missing in the years 1939–1956 was erected in Białystok to commemorate Orthodox Christians of the Białystok region who perished during the anticommunist insurrection in 1946.

In 2020, all victims of the massacres were canonised by the Polish Autocephalous Orthodox Church in a ceremony in Zaleszany, at a monastery whose hegumenia came from a family of survivors. The Divine Liturgy was attended by Archbishops Abel (Popławski) and Grzegorz (Charkiewicz), and Bishop Paweł (Tokajuk).

In 2021, Polish President Andrzej Duda prayed, laid flowers and knelt at the memorial to the victims of the massacre in Zaleszany, after he was invited to visit by local Belarusian residents. He paid tribute to the victims and praised the multicultural heritage of the area, although he did not note who was responsible for the massacre.
