= Artur Zawisza =

Polish far-right politician (born 1969)

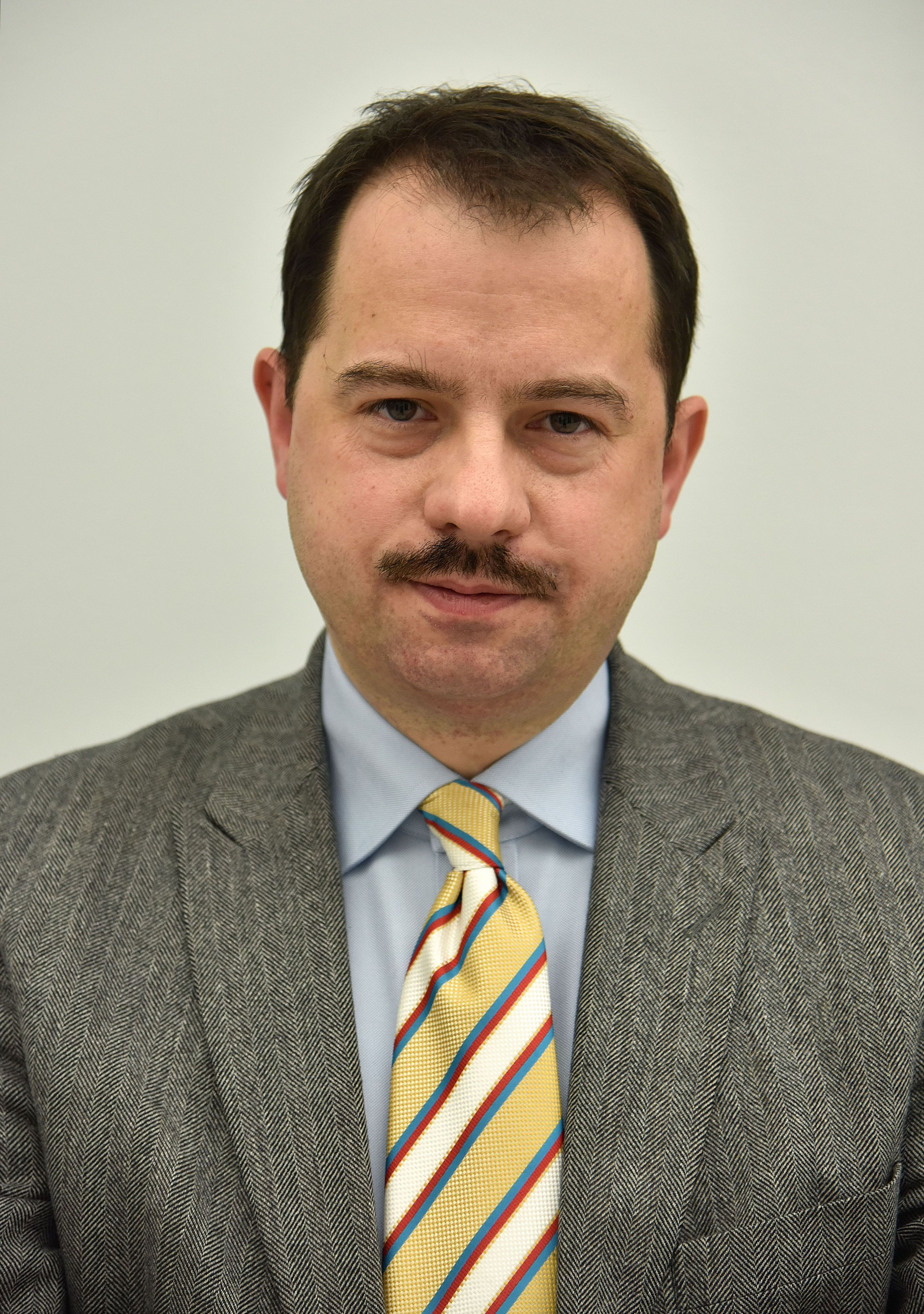
- Portrait of Artur Zawisza

General secretary of Christian National Union
- In office 1999–2000
- Preceded by: Arkadiusz Urban
- Succeeded by: Zbigniew Wawak

Vice-president of Libertas Poland
- In office 2009–2014 Serving with Daniel Pawłowiec

Vice-president of National Movement
- In office 2014–2018

Vice-president of Federation for the Republic
- In office 2018–2019

Member of Sejm
- In office 2001–2007
- Constituency: 20 – Warsaw II

Personal details
- Born: Artur Wojciech Zawisza; 30 March 1969 (age 57) Lublin, Poland
- Party: Christian National Union (1989–2001); Right Alliance (Poland) (2001–2002); Law and Justice (2002–2007); Right Wing of the Republic (2007–2009); Libertas Poland (2009–2014); National Movement (Poland) (2014–2018); Federation for the Republic (2018–2019)
- Children: 3
- Education: Catholic University of Lublin
- Profession: Politician, businessman

Artur Wojciech Zawisza (Polish pronunciation: [ˈartur zaˈvʲiʂa], born 30 March 1969 in Lublin) is a Polish far-right politician and biogas plant industrialist. He served as a Sejm member of the Law and Justice party (2001–2007) and was subsequently the vice-president of Libertas Poland (2009–2014), National Movement (2014–2018), and Federation for the Republic (2018–2019) parties. He has been the president of the nationwide Union of Producers and Employers of Biogas and Biomethane Industry (UPEBBI) syndicate since 2021.

== Biography ==
=== Family background ===
His father, Jerzy, was a Home Army soldier in Western Polesia in 1944 and a member of the anti-Communist resistance. His mother (d. 1983) is buried in the Evangelical section of the Lipowa Street cemetery in Lublin.

=== Political career ===
==== 1980s ====
While attending the Jan Zamoyski High School No. 2 in Lublin (1984–1988) Zawisza served as a unit leader in the Zawisza Association of Catholic Scouting, based on the work of the French Jesuit Jacques Sevin, where his stated goal was to "train cadres for a free and Catholic Poland". In 1988, he was admitted to the Catholic University of Lublin and joined the Vade Mecum Academic Club of Socio-Political Thought, a student debating organisation adhering to the National-Democratic tradition. He later served as a president of the club. After the club's patron, Wiesław Chrzanowski, established the Christian National Union (ZChN) party in 1989, Zawisza became a member. He worked with the party leader for Lublin, Włodzimierz Blajerski, who considered making Zawisza his deputy but found him too radical. In his university years Zawisza made contact with Derek Holland, formerly of the British National Front, a founding leader of the neo-fascist International Third Position in 1989; Zawisza was remembered sporting a Celtic cross badge gifted by Holland. He has been a member of the pro-Russian Conservative-Monarchist Club since the early 1990s.

==== 1990s ====
Zawisza graduated with a Master's degree in Polish studies in 1993. He wrote his thesis on the philosophy of history in the historical fiction of Teodor Jeske-Choiński (1854–1920), the theorist of anti-Semitism as "national self-defence" in Poland, whose books were banned during the Communist era. He also took philosophy courses at university and would later give his occupation as "philosopher" in his Sejm years.

In 1995, Zawisza became an assistant to Marek Jurek, the then president of the National Broadcasting Council, with whom he organised the extreme-right faction in Christian National Union. In 1997 he was offered the position of editor-in-chief in Nasz Dziennik, the prospective press organ of the political Catholic Radio Maryja station, known for its anti-Semitism, by its Redemptorist owner Tadeusz Rydzyk. Zawisza moved from Lublin to Warsaw for the job but Rydzyk rescinded the offer.

From 1997 to 1999, Zawisza was the chief of staff for the Head of the Chancellery of the Prime Minister of Poland Wiesław Walendziak in the Solidarity Electoral Action (AWS) government of Jerzy Buzek. Walendziak, who had served as the CEO of Polish Television (TVP), a State Treasury company, from 1993 to 1996, was notable for having elevated a group of young conservative Catholic radicals of staunch neoliberal persuasion (known derisively as "the Pampers boys", among them Wojciech Cejrowski) to prominence in the public media. During his time as Walendziak's top staffer, Zawisza was placed by his party as an advisor on the executive board of the Universal Pension Society (Powszechne Towarzystwo Emerytalne, PTE), a subsidiary of the Powszechny Zakład Ubezpieczeń (PZU). PZU, a key State Treasury company and Poland's main insurance provider, was privatised in November 1999 through the sale of 30% of its shares to the consortium of Eureko and BIG Bank Gdański dominated by the Opus Dei member Jorge Gonçalves's Banco Comercial Português. A Sejm investigation in 2005 uncovered the transfer of 200m zł from State Treasury companies to fund the Catholic TV station Telewizja Familijna and evidence of corruption behind the choice of the Portuguese partners. The project of a Catholic TV station funded by PZU and other State Treasury companies had originated in the circle of Walendziak, an Opus Dei sympathiser, and was realised strictly in parallel with the privatisation of the PZU. Zawisza was not interviewed by the investigative committee.

==== 2000s ====
From 1999 to 2000, Zawisza served as the general secretary of Christian National Union (1999–2000), under the presidency of Marian Piłka (1996–2000). In 2001 he was appointed an advisor to the minister of culture and national heritage Kazimierz Michał Ujazdowski. He sat on the board of the charitable foundation Crescendum Est Polonia set up by the billionaire Aleksander Gudzowaty.

In 2001, he was involved in founding a new political party called the Right Alliance, with Jurek, Walendziak, Piłka, Ujazdowski, Mariusz Kamiński, Michał Kamiński and Kazimierz Marcinkiewicz as the other co-founders. He was elected to the 2001–2005 Sejm from the Warsaw II district as a Law and Justice deputy in the same year with 10,093 votes, and served on the economy and public finance committees. He was also the president of the Polish-Irish Parliamentary Group. After the merger of the Right Alliance with Law and Justice on 2 June 2002, he took a seat on the national executive of Law and Justice. He was among the minority of party members in opposing the 18 January 2003 proclamation that called for a vote to join the European Union in the 2003 referendum.

In the 2005 Polish parliamentary election Zawisza retained his Warsaw II seat. Between 9 November 2005 and 6 June 2006, he chaired the Sejm economy committee. On 12 May 2006 he was appointed chair of the parliamentary committee investigating the transformation and oversight of the banking sector since 1989. In March 2007 he wrote to the minister of justice Zbigniew Ziobro to demand an investigation into the antifascists who had disrupted a white supremacist public rally held by National Revival of Poland, Zadruga and Blood & Honour in Wrocław. On 19 April 2007, after the Sejm rejected a bill proposal introducing the protection of human pre-natal life into the Constitution of Poland, he left Law and Justice along with the then Marshal of the Sejm Marek Jurek and Małgorzata Bartyzel, and co-founded Jurek's new party, Right Wing of the Republic, on the following day. On 15 May he was voted to be replaced by Adam Hofman as chair of the investigative committee.

Zawisza unsuccessfully contested the pre-term 2007 Polish parliamentary election on the League of Polish Families ballot (per electoral agreement with Right Wing of the Republic).

In March 2009, he became the vice-president of the Eurosceptic Libertas Poland party, founded by the Irish businessman Declan Ganley. He failed to gain a seat in the 2009 European Parliament election with 4,174 votes in the Warsaw constituency and his party fell short of the electoral threshold.

==== 2010s ====
In 2012, the day after the second official Independence March, he co-founded National Movement, whose executive board he then joined in 2013. He headed the Silesian constituency ballot list of the National Movement electoral committee in the 2014 European Parliament election in Poland; he received 5,450 votes and the committee did not meet the electoral threshold. He ran for the Masovian Voivodeship Sejmik in the 2014 Polish local elections; National Movement did not gain any seats. He was appointed vice-president of the National Movement party which he helped establish in December 2014 and of the Christian National Society created in May 2015. In 2018, by which time he had quit the National Movement, he co-founded Federation for the Republic and served as its vice-president until dismissal in September 2019, after which he left the party.

=== Non-governmental activity ===
Zawisza serves as the president of the steering council in the Association for Civic Freedoms, which publishes the far-right revisionist historical quarterly Glaukopis (editor-in-chief Wojciech Muszyński), chiefly concerned with the National Armed Forces, National Democracy's World War II underground military organisation. From 2008 to 2011 he was the president and subsequently vice-president of the Union of National Armed Forces Soldiers, a veterans' organisation. He was accused by members of severe mismanagement and of accepting 20,000 zł on behalf of the organisation from the convicted fraudster Zbigniew Stonoga in 2015. Since 2010, he is the vice-president of the Polish Committee for a Monument to the National Armed Forces, headed by Jan Żaryn.

In 2011, he was appointed to the executive board of the Nowy Ekran (later Neon24.pl) news portal established by the businessman Ryszard Opara. The other board member is Beata Wilecka, daughter of general Tadeusz Wilecki, the leader of the 1994 coup within the Ministry of National Defence and a 2000 presidential candidate. Nowy Ekran was noted for indulging in anti-Semitic tropes, such as the notion that the Soviet Union was a Jewish plot against Russians.

Since 2011, Zawisza has been involved in organising the Independence March, which he described as a political inversion of the hippie movement, i.e. a vehicle for counter-revolutionary counterculture. In another transnational comparison, he pointed to the self-help institutions of the Muslim Brotherhood as a useful model for the neo-fascist National Radical Camp.

Since 2015, he serves as the treasurer of the council in the Federation of the Associations of Veterans and Successors to Independence Struggles of the Polish Republic. The Federation was founded in 2001 by general Stanisław Karolkiewicz, formerly of the Confederation of the Nation and the PAX Association, out of political mistrust towards the post-communist Polish Society of War Veterans. It comprised 8,000 veterans across 13 organisations as of 2016.

Zawisza is the president and founder of the Votum Association-Club of National Political Thought (est. 2013), whose mission is to "support and disseminate Catholic social teaching" and "National-Democratic tradition", and of the Patriotism and Freedom Foundation (est. 2021), which aims "to promote the association between Polish identity and Catholicism", "to strengthen the institutions of marriage and family", "to foster economic deregulation", "to reduce tax burdens", "to protect private property and reverse the instances of unjust dispossession", "to assist in an energy transformation that serves Polish national interest" and "to protect the interests of the Polish countryside".

=== Economic activity ===
At least since 2010, Zawisza has been active as a biogas plant entrepreneur. He is the co-owner and since 2020 an executive director of Green Energy Europe, the CEO of Szafir Energy (since 2013), Biogaz (since 2015) and Biogazownie (since 2019), and an executive director and shareholder in other companies of the sector. He also serves as CEO of the media company Dobra Spółka since 2019.

His closest business associates are:

- Wiesław Różański – president of the Union of Producers and Employers of the Meat Industry (UPEMI) since 2006, who serves as an expert on the Council for Social Consultation at the Ministry of Agriculture and Rural Development and on the specialised committees of the Agency for Restructuring and Modernisation of Agriculture (ARMA) (Polish: Agencja Restrukturyzacji i Modernizacji Rolnictwa),
- Beata Matecka – CEO of the financial services company Business Consulting Group since 2005, CEO of Polskie Technologie Biogazowe since 2020 and the chief executive of other companies,
- Sylwia Koch-Kopyszko – former president of the Union of Producers and Employers of Biogas and Biomethane Industry (UPEBBI), 2012–2021; president of the Polish Association of Electromobility since 2017 and of the Green Gas for the Climate Association since 2021.

Alongside Koch-Kopyszko, Matecka and Różański, Zawisza is an associate of the trading company Continental Enterprise, managed by Anna Różańska, in which he owns shares worth 14.3m zł. They also jointly hold shares in Green Energy Europe and make up the executive board of Instytut Bankowy Szkoleń i Konsultingu, a limited company started in 2010 with the financial backing of 204,500 zł from the president of Polish Agency for Enterprise Development and owned by Business Consulting Group.

In October 2021, Zawisza was elected president of the management board of the UPEBBI, having previously served as the union's vice-president since its formation in 2012. Since 2021, the companies represented by UPEBBI include Orlen Południe SA, a subsidiary of PKN Orlen. Orlen Południe was known as the Trzebinia Refinery until 2015. The refinery was destroyed by 1944 Allied bombing in World War II, rebuilt as part of the Six-Year Plan in 1950–1955, privatised in 1995, and subsumed under PKN Orlen in 1999. Orlen Południe launched the first biorefinery in Poland on the Trzebinia site in 2021. Its first plant is designed for the production of ecological propylene glycol and is the largest of its kind in Europe. A hydrogen fuel plant supplying Kraków's MPK (former state company) public bus fleet began operations in 2022 (after a pilot run in 2021), along with a mobile fuel hub owned by Orlen Południe in the Płaszów area of Kraków. In October 2023, a further plant for producing biofuel from food industry waste was added. Zawisza's deputies (vice-presidents) on the UPEBBI management board were Matecka and briefly (until 2022) Tomasz Nowakowski (b. 1981), at the time the CEO of Orlen Południe (2021–2022), former vice-president (2017–2019) and president (2019–2021) of the Agency for Restructuring and Modernisation of Agriculture, the largest paying agency in the EU.

On 1 December 2023, Zawisza, acting as the host of the Green Gas Poland 2023 conference, presented the departing minister of agriculture and rural development Janusz Kowalski (Sovereign Poland) with the "Biogas Ambassador" award to recognise Kowalski's contribution towards a "brisk, decisive and dynamic" legislative process leading to the 13 July 2023 law on the facilitation of investment in agricultural biogas plants and of their operations. In his award acceptance speech, Kowalski recalled the "difficult" negotiations with the Ministry of Climate and Environment and expressed his hope that the number of biogas plants in Poland would double within a year's time.

== Criminal charges ==
In 2010, the executive board of Green Energy attempted a hostile takeover of the biogas company Lubelskie Biogazownie, which it had agreed to supply with 8m zł equity to match the 20m zł investment grant awarded by the National Fund for Environmental Protection and Water Management, by replacing its management. The appellate court in Warsaw declared the move illegal in 2016 but cleared Zawisza and associates of criminal charges.

In April 2016, Zawisza was handed with a 3-year driving disqualification, a fine and a compensation order for drunk driving; the sentence was upheld by the Lublin district court in January 2017 against an appeal. He then inflicted multiple bone fractures on a cyclist in a road collision as an unlicensed driver on 25 October 2019 and was arrested for the offence after having been recognised by a witness. In his defence, Zawisza claimed to have been compelled to drive as the sole breadwinner of his family. He was presented with four criminal charges in June 2020. On 21 December 2021, he was issued with a 10 months' prison suspended sentence and a 2-year driving ban, and ordered to pay a 5,000 zł fine and a 60,000 zł compensation to the injured cyclist by the Warsaw-Mokotów court. In April 2023, Zawisza was found by an investigative journalist to have routinely ignored the driving ban. The Mokotów court began proceedings to enact the suspended prison sentence on 6 April 2023.

On 1 June 2021, Zawisza took part in a demonstration of support for Janusz Waluś, a white supremacist terrorist convicted of the most high-profile political murder in defence of the apartheid in the Republic of South Africa, held in front of the South African embassy in Warsaw. The rally was organised by the neo-fascist National Revival of Poland. In his speech, Zawisza lauded Waluś as "a hero of the European civilisation". In September 2021, prosecutor Maciej Młynarczyk of the Praga-North District Prosecutor's Office charged Zawisza with public glorification of politically-motivated violence. The Praga Regional Prosecutor's Office, headed by Łukasz Osiński, removed Młynarczyk from the investigation and transferred it – as it did with multiple other hate crime cases during Zbigniew Ziobro's term as Public Prosecutor General – to the Praga-South District Prosecutor's Office. On 21 December 2021 prosecutor Ewa Prostak of Praga-South terminated the proceedings and cleared Zawisza of the criminal charge. The official statement of the Praga-South District Prosecutor's Office used anti-Communism to justify its ruling. It argued that Zawisza acted with the lawful intention of engaging in "a polemic on the subject of Chris Hani's murder, outlining the historical background to the event, recalling who Chris Hani was, and portraying Janusz Waluś as acting in the interest of South African citizens by attempting to rescue his adopted country from the ordeal, the evil and the crimes of communism".

== Personal life ==
He has been married to Marzena since 1995 and has two daughters, Marta and Magdalena, and a son, Wojciech.
