= Mariusz Bechta =

Polish neo-Nazi

- Born: Mariusz Ryszard Bechta; 1972 (age 53–54); Biała Podlaska, Lublin Voivodeship, Polish People's Republic
- Known for: Promoting fascism in Poland
- Movement: Neo-Nazism
- Awards: Cross of Merit

Academic background
- Education: University of Warsaw
- Thesis: Konspiracja polityczna i wojskowa polskiego obozu narodowego na Podlasiu w latach 1939-1952 (2011)

Mariusz Bechta (born 1972) is a Polish historian and publisher, affiliated with the Institute of National Remembrance (IPN). Bechta has published various fascist literature and patronaged the growth of Nazi rock (Rock Against Communism) in Poland; his academic monographs — themed around rebuffing Polish complicity with the Nazis in the murder of Jews — have been severely criticized by historians and held as ideological tracts.

== Education and career ==
Bechta was born in 1972 in Biała Podlaska. He graduated from the Faculty of History at the University of Warsaw in 1997. He received his doctoral degree in 2011 from the same faculty under Tomasz Wituch, with a thesis titled Konspiracja polityczna i wojskowa polskiego obozu narodowego na Podlasiu w latach 1939-1952 (transl. Political and military conspiracy of the Polish national camp in Podlasie in the years 1939-1952). Two years earlier, he had joined the IPN and has been affiliated with the institute ever since; as of 2022, Bechta holds the rank of a 'specialist'.

== Works and views ==
During his student days, Bechta organized a solidarity event for Janusz Waluś, a Polish neo-Nazi extremist convicted for assassinating the General Secretary of the South African Communist Party. Around the same time, he founded the music label Narodowa Scena Rockowa (NSR) with his brother, which patronised the development of Nazi rock in Poland; it sponsored Nazi records, sold racist t-shirts, and organized musical concerts. Using their connections with conservative dailies, the brothers sought to mainstream Nazi bands.

A few years later, they started two advertising-cum-publishing agencies — Arte and Oficyna Wydawnicza Rekonkwista — which primarily republished works by European fascists, including by Léon Degrelle, Julius Evola, Jan Mosdorf, Robert Brasillach, Ryszard Mozgol, and Krzysztof Kawęcki. Since 2003, Bechta has been the Editor-in-Chief of Templum Novum, a fascist magazine.

== Reception ==
Kornelia Kończal, a professor of East European History at Bielefeld University, sees Bechta's interpretation of the Lublin pogrom of Jews — as an act of Polish "revenge" against pro-communist Jews — to downplay and ignore the historical evidence. Similarly, Mariusz Zajączkowski, a historian specializing in Ukrainian-Polish relations, rejects Bechta's interpretation of the pogrom as unsupported by evidence and questions his ideological motivations; Bechta not only drew from very poor sources including those recorded decades after the event but also misrepresented archival sources and cherry-picked evidence.

Mariusz Mazur, a historian of communism in Poland, finds Bechta's works wholly unreliable, unethical, and ahistorical; he compares Bechta's methodology with that of David Irving, a Holocaust denier. Mazur alleges that Bechta cherry-picks evidence to fit them into a preconceived worldview — for an example, in absolving Romuald Rajs and other members of his brigade from accusations of ethnocide, he did not even consider their testimony rife with anti-minority sentiments. He critiques Bechta's defense of the National Armed Forces against charges of anti-semitism — by invoking the few Jew officials in their ranks — as unbecoming of a professional historian.

August Grabski, an assistant professor at the Jewish Historical Institute in Warsaw, finds Bechta's works ideologically motivated and guided by antisemitism.
