= Glaukopis =

Far-right history journal in Poland

- Discipline: History
- Language: Polish
- Edited by: Wojciech Muszyński

Publication details
- History: 2003–present

Standard abbreviations
- ISO 4: Glaukopis

Indexing
- ISSN: 1730-3419
- LCCN: 2005248129
- OCLC no.: 58401207

Links
- Journal homepage; [glaukopis.pl/polrocznik Online archive]

Glaukopis is a nationalist Polish history journal catering to the far right. It was founded by Wojciech Muszyński.

== History ==
The magazine was established by Wojciech Muszyński and his wife in 2003 – among its aims were to reject "political correctness" on controversial topics and present "truthful research" on Polish-Jewish relations. It is published in cooperation with the Department of Polish Studies at The Institute of World Politics. Muszyński remained its editor-in-chief until 2019.

In 2021, the magazine was controversially entered into a list of scientific journals approved by the Government of Poland by the then Minister of Education and Science Przemysław Czarnek.

== Reception ==
Andrzej Żbikowski believes that the publication's primary aim is to rehabilitate the wartime activities of the National Armed Forces unconditionally. Andreas Kahrs characterized Glaukopis as a right-wing source in a study of Polish right-wing extremism, noting that its website linked to that of the far right All-Polish Youth and that Muszyński had appeared as a speaker at events held by the extreme right-wing National Radical Camp; he viewed it as part of an effort by certain Polish historians to make the precursors of today's far-right organisations in Poland look respectable again. Jan Grabowski has judged the journal to cater to the Polish far right and considers it an unreliable source; he highlights that Mariusz Bechta, who continues to be affiliated with the journal, had published various works by European fascists, including Léon Degrelle, Julius Evola, and Jan Mosdorf. The Gazeta Wyborcza has described Glaukopis' political stance as nationalist or far right.

The publication has been accused of publishing antisemitic material, and was the subject of a controversy involving distortion of the history of the Holocaust on Wikipedia.
