= Wojciech Muszyński =

Polish historian and researcher (born 1972)

- Born: Wojciech Jerzy Muszyński; 1972 (age 53–54); Warsaw, Warsaw Voivodeship, Polish People's Republic
- Known for: Writing historical books

Academic background
- Education: Cardinal Stefan Wyszyński University
- Thesis: Powstanie i działalność środowiska politycznego Organizacji Polskiej w latach 1934–1944 (2010)
- Doctoral advisor: Jan Żaryn

Academic work
- Discipline: History
- Sub-discipline: History of Poland
- Institutions: Institute of National Remembrance
- Notable works: Glaukopis

Wojciech Jerzy Muszyński (born 1972) is a Polish historian . His areas of interest are the recent history of Poland and military history.

== Education and career ==
In 1998, after graduating from the Department of History at the Warsaw University, Muszyński began his career as an independent scholar. During this time, he was affiliated with the Republicans and took a lead role in re-establishing the Sarmatia Academic Corporation whose alumni staffed the offices of President Lech Kaczyński and Andrzej Duda from the Law and Justice Party. Muszyński received his doctoral degree in 2010 at the Cardinal Stefan Wyszyński University in Warsaw under the supervision of Jan Żaryn.

Whilst pursuing his doctorate, both he and Żaryn joined the Institute of National Remembrance. Muszyński has been affiliated to the institute ever since, and as of 2022 holds the rank of a "Senior Specialist".

== Works ==
In 2003, Muszyński established the Glaukopis, a far-right-wing Polish journal on history; among its aims were to reject "political correctness" on controversial topics and present "truthful research" on Polish-Jewish relations. He remained the Editor-in-Chief until 2019.

== Views ==
Some of the Polish media have described him as controversial due to his association with Polish nationalist groups such as the Kukiz'15 association, and his research on controversial historical figures such as Romuald Rajs.

In 2016, Kukiz'15 nominated Muszyński to the Collegium of the Institute of National Remembrance; during his candidacy, he posted an image of Barack Obama hanging from a noose on social media alongside a racist video about immigrants. Disciplinary proceedings were initiated; he was threatened with termination but eventually let off with a warning.

In 2019, Muszyński suggested that members of the left-wing Razem party should be thrown from helicopters as was done to leftists in Chile by the Pinochet dictatorship. Covering the incident, OKO.press noted that Muszyński had a long record of indulging in ultra-nationalist politics and whitewashing dictators.

== Honors ==
He was awarded with the Gold Cross of Merit in 2016, the Cross of Freedom and Solidarity in 2019 and Gold Medal of Merit for Polish Science in 2023.

== Selected bibliography ==
=== Books ===
- Bolesław Piasecki 1915-1944. Początki Drogi (2023)
- Toreadorzy Hitlera. Hiszpańscy ochotnicy w Wehrmachcie i Waffen-SS 1941-1945 (2019)
- Białe Legiony przeciwko bolszewikom. Polskiej formacje wojskowe w Rosji 1918-1920 (2019)
- Józef Dowbor-Muśnicki 1867-1937, coauthored with Rafał Sierchuła (2018)
- Architekt Wielkiej Polski. Roman Dmowski 1864-1939, coauthored with Jolanta Mysiakowska-Muszyńska (2018)
- Białe Legiony 1914-1918. Od Legionu Puławskiego do I Korpusu Polskiego (2018)
- Przeciwko Pax Sovietica. Narodowe Zjednoczenie Wojskowe i struktury polityczne ruchu narodowego wobec reżimu komunistycznego 1944-1956, coauthored with M. Bechta (2017)
- Józef Haller 1873-1960, współaut. K. Kaczmarski i R. Sierchuła (2017)
- Polska dla Polaków! Kim byli i są polscy narodowcy,coauthored with M. J. Chodakiewicz and Jolanta Mysiakowska-Muszyńska (2015)
- Golden Harvest or Hearts of Gold. Studies on the Fate of Wartime Poles and Jews, coedition with Marek J. Chodakiewicz and Pawel Styrna (2012)
- Duch młodych. Organizacja Polska i Obóz Narodowo-Radykalny w latach 1934-1944 (2011)
- Błękitna dywizja. Ochotnicy hiszpańscy na froncie wschodnim 1941-1945 (2002)
- W walce o Wielką Polskę. Propaganda zaplecza politycznego Narodowych Sił Zbrojnych 1939-1945 (2000)
