= Belarusians in Poland =

Ethnic group in Poland

Białorusini w Polsce

Total population
- 47,000, 0.12% of Polish population (Census 2011)

Regions with significant populations
- Podlaskie Voivodeship

Languages
- Belarusian, Russian, Polish

Religion
- Polish Orthodoxy, Roman Catholicism, Greek Catholicism

The Belarusian minority in Poland (Belarusian: Беларусы ў Польшчы, romanized: Biełarusy ŭ Polščy; Polish: Białorusini w Polsce) is composed of 47,000 people according to the Polish census of 2011. This number decreased in the last decades from over 300,000 due to an active process of assimilation. Most of them live in the Podlaskie Voivodeship.

A small but unconfirmed Belarusian population remains in the West Pomeranian Voivodeship in western Poland. They may be assimilated into the Polish population, but Belarusian culture has not firmly disappeared in the whole of Poland since World War II.

== History ==
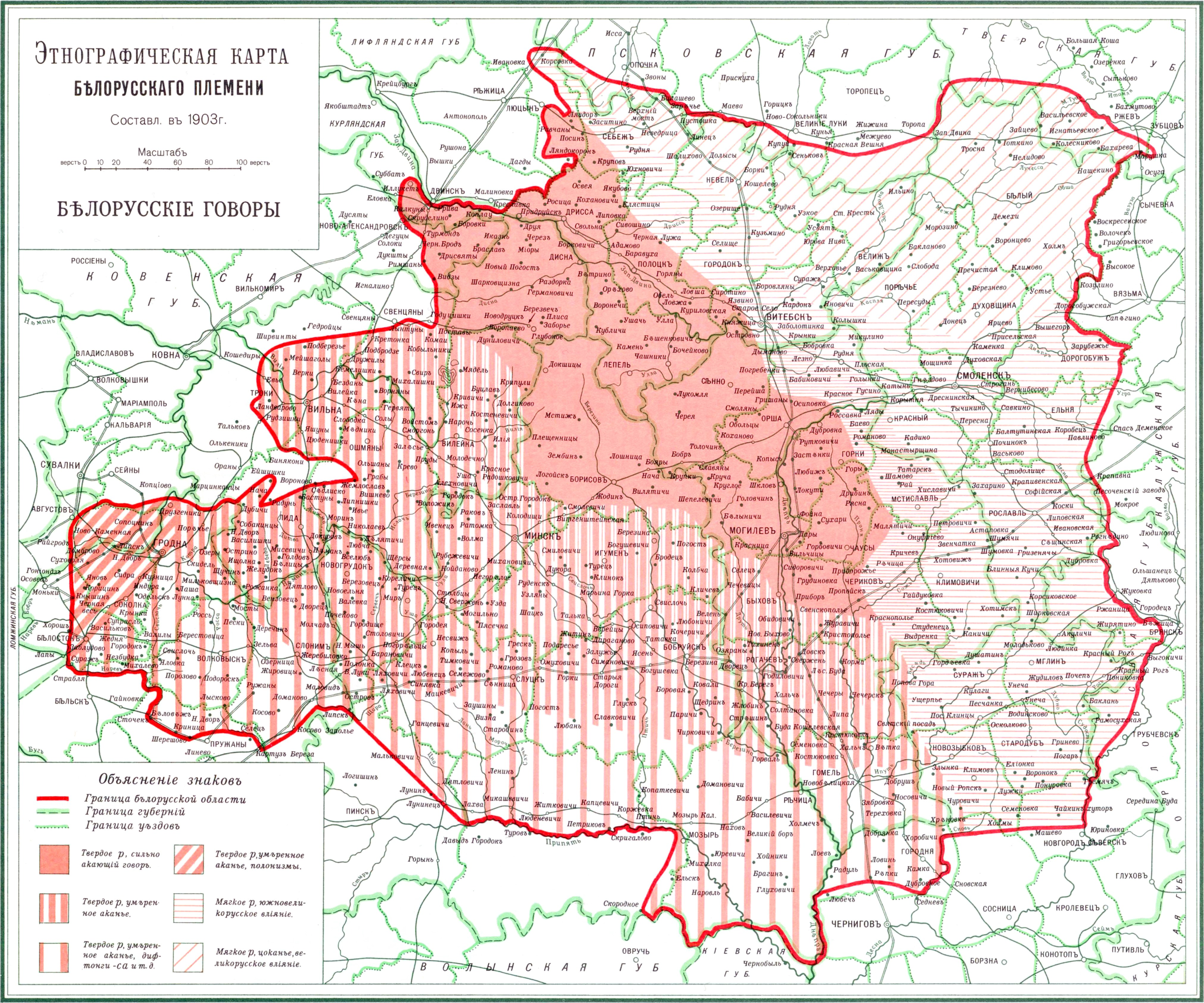
Belarusians, 1903

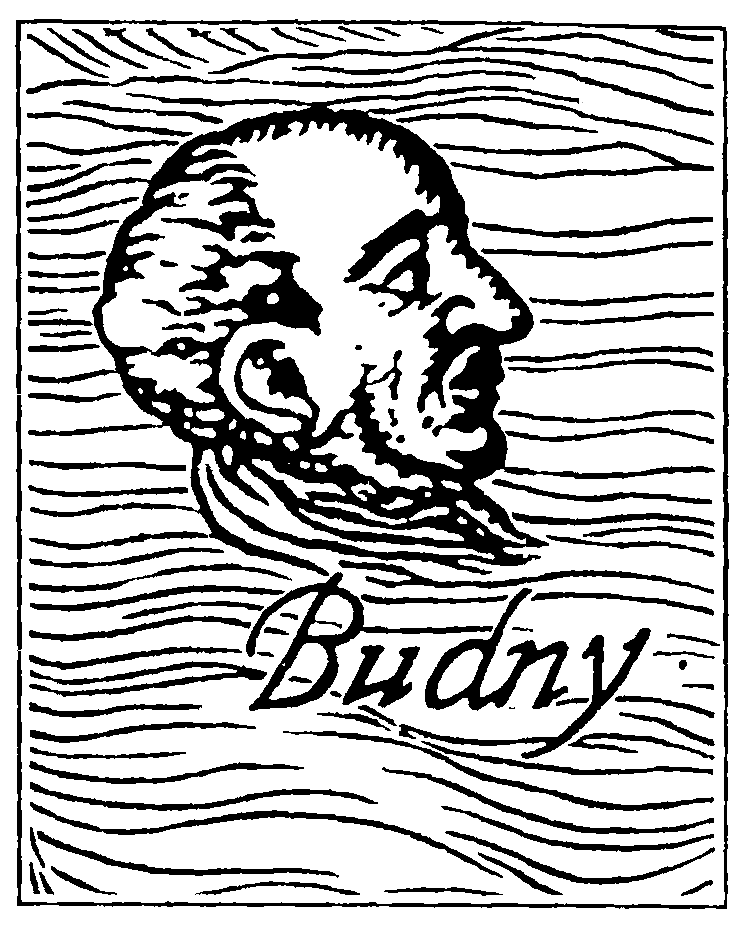
Symon Budny

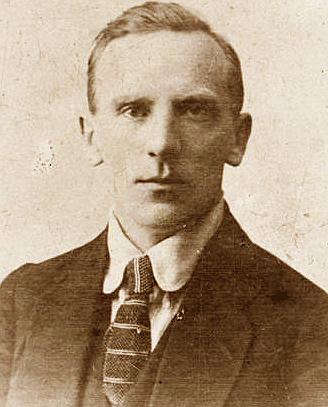
Francišak Alachnovič

=== Polish–Lithuanian Commonwealth ===
Poland first acquired a Ruthenian (predominant ancestors of modern Belarusians) minority in the 16th century, when after the Union of Lublin in 1569 Poland gained control over some of eastern territories formerly belonging to the Grand Duchy of Lithuania. Poland retained control over that region until the partitions of Poland in the late 18th century. In time, the Belarusian culture and nationality started to develop in that region, but also increasing number of people became Polonized. Later influences, particularly Lithuanization and Russification, further contributed to the blurry ethnic border and resulted in a region with many territories with significant minority of one culture or another.

=== 1918–1939 ===
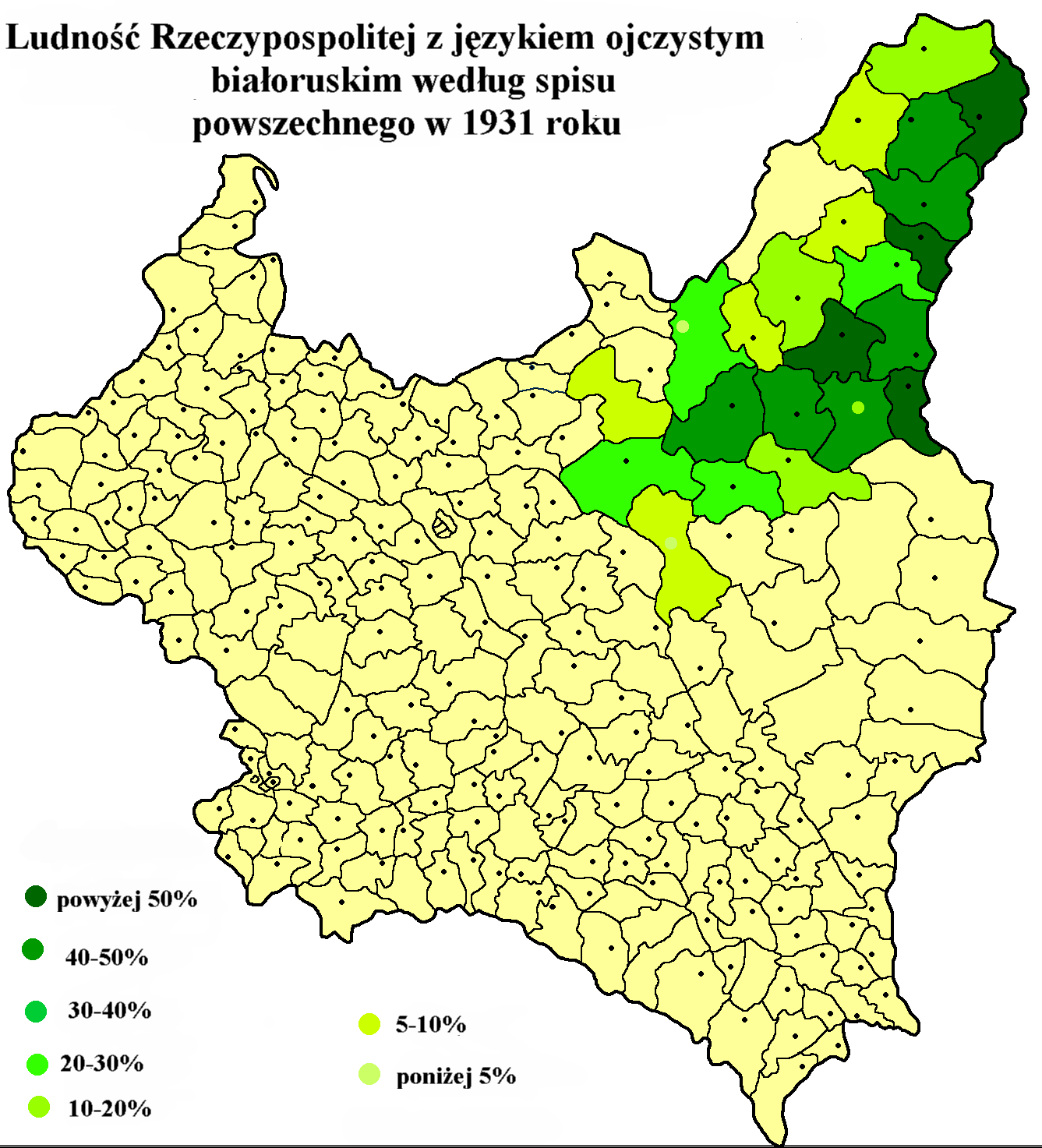
Belarusian language frequency in Poland based on Polish census of 1931

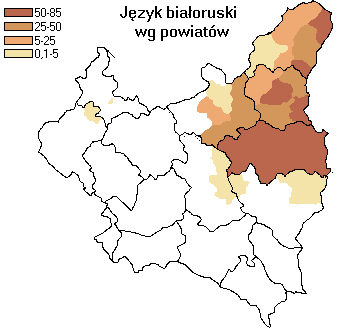
Belarusian minority in the Second Polish Republic

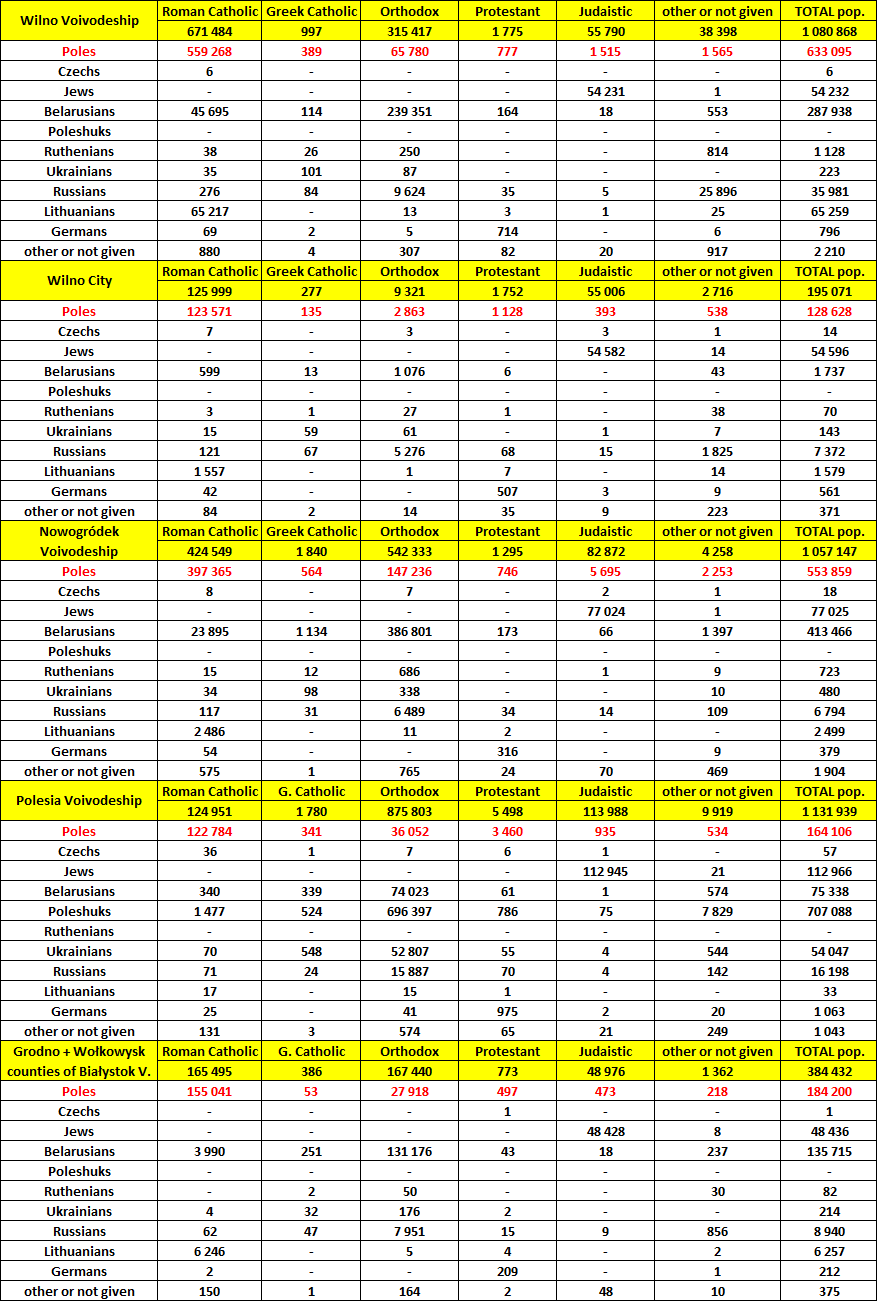
Linguistic (mother tongue) and religious structure of Northern Kresy (today parts of Belarus and Lithuania) according to the Polish census of 1931

In 1921, at the end of the Polish–Soviet War, Belarusian territories were divided between Second Polish Republic and Soviet Russia under the terms of the Peace of Riga. Thus the newly reborn Poland gained a disputed territory, known as Kresy or West Belarus, inhabited by both Belarusians and Poles. According to the Polish census of 1921, there were around 1 million Belarusians in the country. According to Soviet sources, there were 3 million Belarusians in 1921. Most historians estimate the number of Belarusians in Poland at that time to be from 1.7 million up to 2 million. Belarusians formed 3.1% of the populations of the Second Polish Republic, mostly inhabiting the east-central voivodeships, particularly the Nowogródek Voivodeship. Belarusians consisted the majority of population of Polesie Voivodship, however most of them didn't declare themselves as Belarusians, but at Tutejsi ("Locals").

Several thousand Poles were settled in the area pursuant to the legislation of December 20, 1920. In the elections of November 1922, a Belarusian party (in the Blok Mniejszości Narodowych coalition) obtained 14 seats in the Polish parliament (11 of them in the lower chamber, Sejm). In the spring of 1923, Prime Minister of Poland Władysław Sikorski ordered a report on the situation of the Belarusian minority in Poland. That summer, a new regulation was passed allowing for the Belarusian language to be used officially both in courts and in schools. Obligatory teaching of Belarusian was introduced in all Polish gymnasia in areas inhabited by Belarusians in 1927.

In the 1921–1926 period Poland did not have a consistent policy towards its ethnic minorities. Belarusian schools, not being subsidized by the Polish government, were facing severe financial problems already by 1921. After an early period of liberalization, tensions between increasingly nationalistic Polish government and various increasingly separatist ethnic minorities started to grow, and the Belarusian minority was no exception. A Belarusian organization, the Belarusian Peasants' and Workers' Union, was banned in 1927, and opposition to Polish government was met with state repressions. Nonetheless, compared to the (larger) Ukrainian minority, Belarusians were much less politically aware and active, and thus suffered fewer repressions than the Ukrainians.

Increasingly, Belarusians in Poland faced extensive Polonization. After the 1930 elections in Poland, Belarusian representation in the Polish parliament was reduced and in the early 1930s the Polish government started to introduce policies intended to Polonize minorities.

In 1935, after the death of Józef Piłsudski, a new wave of repressions was released upon the minorities, with many Orthodox churches and Belarusian schools being closed. In 1938 about 100 Orthodox churches were destroyed or converted to Roman Catholic ones in the eastern parts of Poland, the majority of them in ethnically Ukrainian territories. Use of Belarusian was discouraged. Not a single Belarusian school survived until the spring of 1939, and only 44 schools teaching Belarusian still existed in Poland at the beginning of World War II.

Belarusian leadership was sent to Bereza Kartuska concentration camp. Earlier, Belarusian political leaders reported to the League of Nations of suspects being flogged by police and subject to torture in interrogations.

After the August 1939 Nazi-Soviet Pact and pursuant German and Soviet invasion of Poland in September 1939, portrayed by Soviet propaganda as 'liberation of Western Belarus and Western Ukraine', many Belarusians welcomed unification with Byelorussian SSR. Since 1939, with the exception of a brief period of Nazi occupation, almost all Belarusians previously living in Poland would live in the Byelorussian SSR.

It was initially planned to move the capital of the Byelorussian SSR to Vilnius. However, the same year Joseph Stalin ordered that the city and surrounding region be transferred to Lithuania, which some months later was also invaded by Soviet Union and became a new Soviet Republic – Lithuanian SSR. Minsk therefore was proclaimed the capital of the enlarged Byelorussian SSR. The borders of the BSSR were again altered after the war (notably the largely Polish area around the city of Białystok was returned to Poland) but in general they coincide with the borders of the modern Republic of Belarus.

==== Demographics ====
The results of the 1931 census (questions about mother tongue and about religion) in voivodeships with significant Belarusian populations. Belarusian/Poleshuk("Tutejszy")/Russian and Orthodox/Greek Catholic majority minority counties are highlighted with yellow:

Belarusian and Polish population in voivodeships with significant Belarusian population according to the 1931 census
| Today part of | County part of Voivodeship | County | Pop. | Belarusian, Poleshuk & Russian | % | Polish | % | Orthodox & Uniate | % | Roman Catholic | % |
|---|---|---|---|---|---|---|---|---|---|---|---|
| (Belarus) (Lithuania) | Wilno | Braslaw | 143161 | 37689 | 26.3% | 93958 | 65.6% | 29713 | 20.8% | 89020 | 62.2% |
| (Belarus) | Wilno | Dzisna | 159886 | 85051 | 53.2% | 62282 | 39.0% | 88118 | 55.1% | 56895 | 35.6% |
| (Belarus) | Wilno | Molodechno | 91285 | 49747 | 54.5% | 35523 | 38.9% | 63074 | 69.1% | 21704 | 23.8% |
| (Belarus) | Wilno | Oshmyany | 104612 | 11064 | 10.6% | 84951 | 81.2% | 15125 | 14.5% | 81369 | 77.8% |
| (Belarus) | Wilno | Pastavy | 99907 | 49071 | 49.1% | 47917 | 48.0% | 44477 | 44.5% | 50751 | 50.8% |
| (Lithuania) (Belarus) | Wilno | Švenčionys | 136475 | 16814 | 12.3% | 68441 | 50.1% | 1978 | 1.4% | 117524 | 86.1% (Note: This share of Roman Catholics included 42,993 Roman Catholic Lithuanians or around 31.5% of the county's total population.) |
| (Belarus) | Wilno | Vilyeyka | 131070 | 65220 | 49.8% | 59477 | 45.4% | 70664 | 53.9% | 53168 | 40.6% |
| (Lithuania) (Belarus) | Wilno | Vilnius-Trakai | 214472 | 9263 | 4.3% | 180546 | 84.2% | 2988 | 1.4% | 201053 | 93.7% |
| (Lithuania) | Wilno | Vilnius City | 195071 | 9109 | 4.7% | 128628 | 65.9% | 9598 | 4.9% | 125999 | 64.6% |
| Total in Wilno Voivodeship | | | 1275939 | 333028 | 26.1% | 761723 | 59.7% | 325735 | 25.5% | 797483 | 62.5% |
| (Belarus) | Nowogródek | Baranavichy | 161038 | 70627 | 43.9% | 74916 | 46.5% | 99118 | 61.5% | 45126 | 28.0% |
| (Belarus) | Nowogródek | Lida | 183485 | 20538 | 11.2% | 145609 | 79.4% | 23025 | 12.5% | 144627 | 78.8% |
| (Belarus) | Nowogródek | Nyasvizh | 114464 | 77094 | 67.4% | 27933 | 24.4% | 82245 | 71.9% | 22378 | 19.6% |
| (Belarus) | Nowogródek | Novogrudok | 149536 | 103783 | 69.4% | 35084 | 23.5% | 109162 | 73.0% | 28796 | 19.3% |
| (Belarus) | Nowogródek | Slonim | 126510 | 63445 | 50.2% | 52313 | 41.4% | 89724 | 70.9% | 23817 | 18.8% |
| (Belarus) | Nowogródek | Stowbtsy | 99389 | 40875 | 41.1% | 51820 | 52.1% | 54076 | 54.4% | 37856 | 38.1% |
| (Belarus) | Nowogródek | Shchuchyn | 107203 | 10658 | 9.9% | 89462 | 83.5% | 38900 | 36.3% | 60097 | 56.1% |
| (Belarus) | Nowogródek | Valozhyn | 115522 | 33240 | 28.8% | 76722 | 66.4% | 47923 | 41.5% | 61852 | 53.5% |
| Total in Nowogródek Voivodeship | | | 1057147 | 420260 | 39.8% | 553859 | 52.4% | 544173 | 51.5% | 424549 | 40.2% |
| (Belarus) | Polesie | Brest | 215927 | 115323 | 53.4% | 50248 | 23.3% | 135911 | 62.9% | 43020 | 19.9% |
| (Belarus) | Polesie | Drahichyn | 97040 | 81557 | 84.0% | 6844 | 7.1% | 83147 | 85.7% | 5699 | 5.9% |
| (Belarus) (Ukraine) | Polesie | Kamin-Kashyrskyi (Note: Kamin-Kashyrskyi County's population according to the 1921 census included 41,522 Ukrainians, 9,183 Poleshuks ("Tutejszy") and just 6 Belarusians. According to the 1931 census this county's population included 74,313 Poleshuk ("Tutejszy" language), 8,271 Ukrainian, 1,136 Belarusian and 250 Russian speakers.) | 94988 | 75699 | 79.7% | 6692 | 7.0% | 83113 | 87.5% | 6026 | 6.3% |
| (Belarus) | Polesie | Kobryn | 113972 | 71435 | 62.7% | 10040 | 8.8% | 93426 | 82.0% | 8973 | 7.9% |
| (Belarus) | Polesie | Kosava | 83696 | 68769 | 82.2% | 8456 | 10.1% | 68941 | 82.4% | 7810 | 9.3% |
| (Belarus) | Polesie | Luninyets | 108663 | 83769 | 77.1% | 16535 | 15.2% | 85728 | 78.9% | 13754 | 12.7% |
| (Belarus) (Ukraine) | Polesie | Pinsk | 184305 | 128787 | 69.9% | 29077 | 15.8% | 140022 | 76.0% | 16465 | 8.9% |
| (Belarus) | Polesie | Pruzhany | 108583 | 81032 | 74.6% | 17762 | 16.4% | 82015 | 75.5% | 16311 | 15.0% |
| (Belarus) (Ukraine) | Polesie | Stolin | 124765 | 92253 | 73.9% | 18452 | 14.8% | 105280 | 84.4% | 6893 | 5.5% |
| Total in Polesie Voivodeship | | | 1131939 | 798624 | 70.6% | 164106 | 14.5% | 877583 | 77.5% | 124951 | 11.0% |
| (Poland) | Białystok | Augustów | 74751 | 1582 | 2.1% | 68674 | 91.9% | 875 | 1.2% | 67821 | 90.7% |
| (Poland) | Białystok | Białystok City | 91101 | 3781 | 4.2% | 46386 | 50.9% | 7628 | 8.4% | 41493 | 45.5% |
| (Poland) | Białystok | Białystok County | 140078 | 11465 | 8.2% | 116709 | 83.3% | 22035 | 15.7% | 105685 | 75.4% |
| (Poland) | Białystok | Bielsk Podlaski | 202410 | 70356 | 34.8% | 111377 | 55.0% | 91749 | 45.3% | 91215 | 45.1% |
| (Belarus) (Lithuania) | Białystok | Grodno | 213105 | 69832 | 32.8% | 101089 | 47.4% | 87205 | 40.9% | 89122 | 41.8% (Note: This share of Roman Catholics included 6,246 Roman Catholic Lithuanians or just over 2.9% of the county's total population.) |
| (Poland) | Białystok | Łomża | 168167 | 129 | 0.1% | 146308 | 87.0% | 295 | 0.2% | 145230 | 86.4% |
| (Poland) | Białystok | Ostrołęka | 112587 | 49 | 0.0% | 104341 | 92.7% | 166 | 0.1% | 103871 | 92.3% |
| (Poland) | Białystok | Ostrów Mazowiecka | 99741 | 60 | 0.1% | 85925 | 86.1% | 160 | 0.2% | 85540 | 85.8% |
| (Poland) | Białystok | Sokółka | 103135 | 2107 | 2.0% | 92816 | 90.0% | 13329 | 12.9% | 81030 | 78.6% |
| (Poland) | Białystok | Suwałki | 110124 | 6289 | 5.7% | 85707 | 77.8% | 1519 | 1.4% | 87350 | 79.3% |
| (Poland) | Białystok | Szczuczyn | 68215 | 117 | 0.2% | 60935 | 89.3% | 200 | 0.3% | 60763 | 89.1% |
| (Belarus) | Białystok | Volkovysk | 171327 | 74823 | 43.7% | 83111 | 48.5% | 80621 | 47.1% | 76373 | 44.6% |
| (Poland) | Białystok | Wysokie Mazowieckie | 89103 | 148 | 0.2% | 78881 | 88.5% | 376 | 0.4% | 78584 | 88.2% |
| Total in Białystok Voivodeship | | | 1643844 | 240738 | 14.6% | 1182259 | 71.9% | 306158 | 18.6% | 1114077 | 67.8% |
| Total in four voivodeships | | | 5108869 | 1792650 | 35.1% | 2661947 | 52.1% | 2053649 | 40.2% | 2461060 | 48.2% |

=== After the Second World War ===
In 1946, 79 Polish nationals of Belarusian ethnicity were murdered by members of the Polish Extraordinary Special Actions unit of the National Military Union. In 2012, the Monument to Orthodox inhabitants of Białystok who were killed and went missing in the years 1939–1956 was erected in Białystok to commemorate Orthodox Christians of the Białystok region who perished during the massacres in 1946.

During the thaw of that year, a lot of national minority societies and their press organs were established in Poland. Since 1956, the newspaper Niva is being published in Belarusian language in the city of Białystok.

=== 1989–present ===
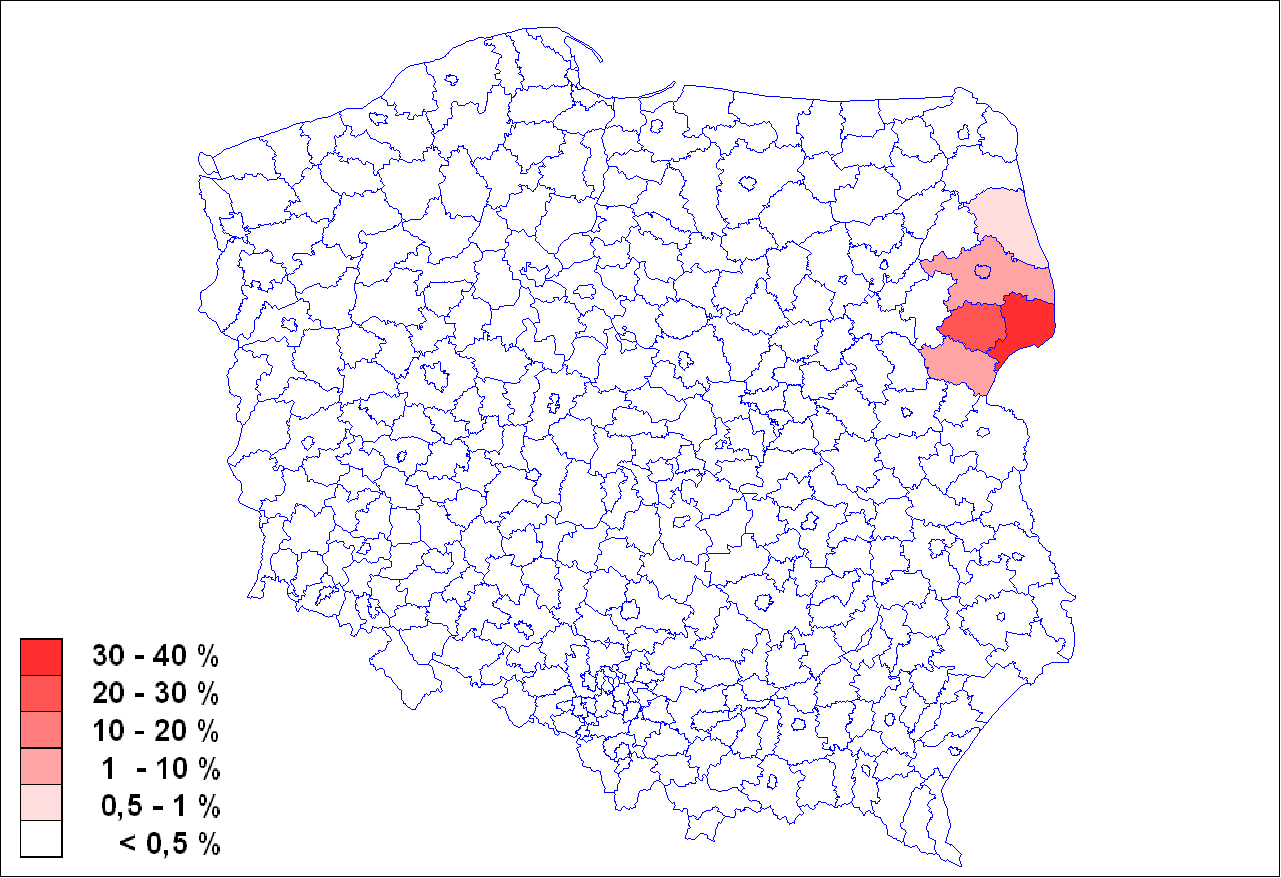
Belarusians in Poland, 2002

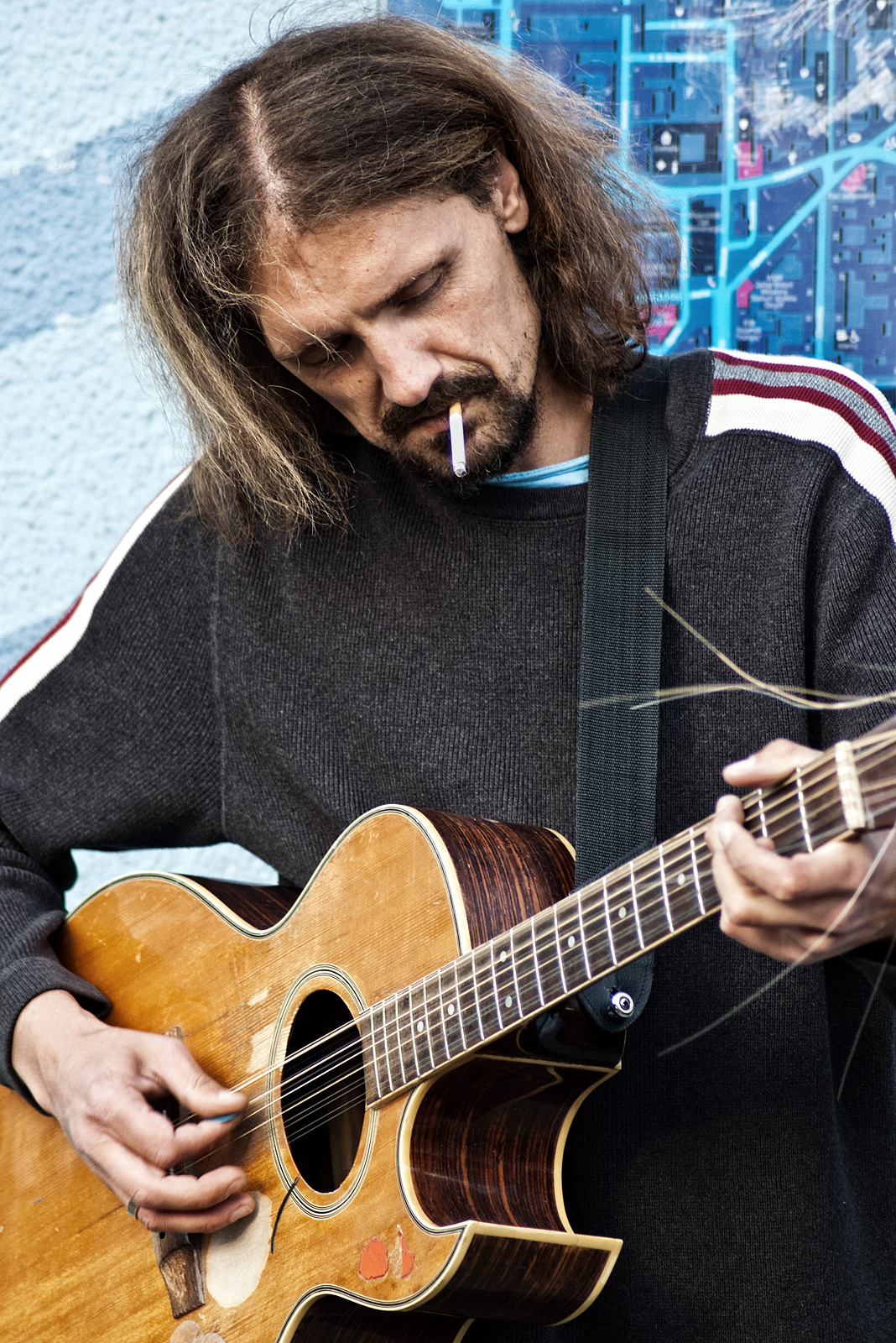
Gienek Loska

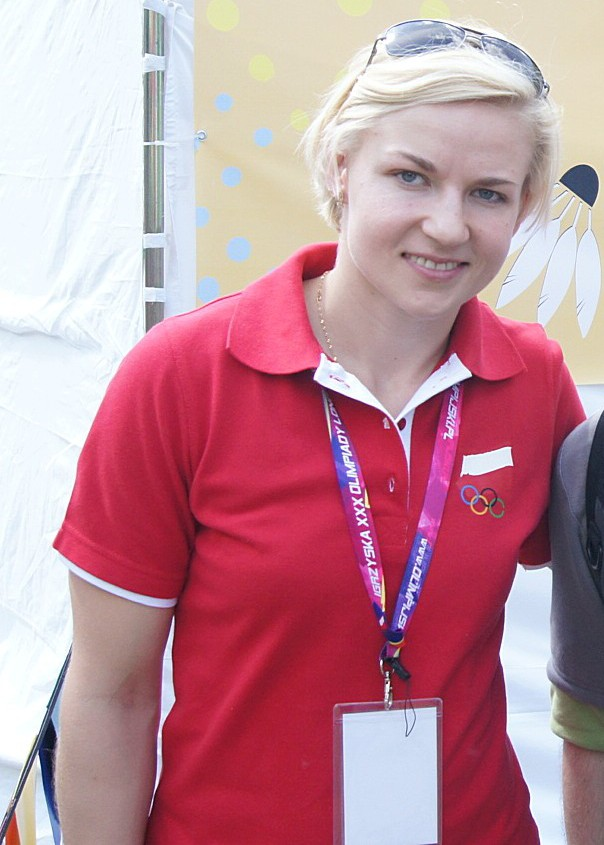
Nadieżda Kostiuczyk

The Belarusian minority has been active in political life in Poland since 1989. In the 2006 elections to the Podlaskie Sejmik, the Białoruski Komitet Wyborczy (Belarusian Electoral Committee) received 7,914 votes (2.05%), however this was not enough to receive any seats in the council. The most votes from this list were for Jan Czykwin (2,405), Eugeniusz Wappa (1,669) and Eugeniusz Mironowicz (1,119).

When the local elections were repeated in the region on 20 May 2007, the Belarusians again submitted their own electoral committee, which for the first time had several Lithuanians running on the list, in their region of Sejny and Puńsk.

There is an unknown number of Belarusians in northwest Poland, but some Polish Belarusians were relocated there by the Soviet invasion of Germany in April 1945 and the captured lands of formerly German Pomerania was annexed by Poland.

In 2019 Eugeniusz Czykwin has been elected to the Polish Sejm on the Koalicja Obywatelska list, being the representative of the Belarusian and Orthodox minority in the parliament.

== See also ==
- Belarusians in Poznań
- Population exchange between Poland and Soviet Belarus in the aftermath of World War II
- Belarus–Poland relations
- Bilingual municipalities in Poland
- Kresy
- West Belarus
- Stanisław Bułak-Bałachowicz
- Polish minority in Belarus
