= Belarusians in Poznań =

Belarusian diaspora community in Poznań, Poland

Belarusians in Poznań are the community of Belarusians and citizens of Belarus living in Poznań, Poland. In 2025 about 3,000 Belarusian citizens were registered in the city, the second-largest group of foreigners after citizens of Ukraine. Poznań's links with the lands of present-day Belarus go back to the 15th–16th centuries: Francysk Skaryna stayed in the city, and the Raczyński Library holds a manuscript with Old Belarusian translations of chivalric romances. Belarusian cultural, educational and religious initiatives are active in the city.

== Population ==
According to the city administration, on 31 May 2025 there were 12,114 foreign nationals registered in Poznań, including 3,041 citizens of Belarus (25%), the second-largest group after citizens of Ukraine (5,780); four years earlier 1,022 Belarusian citizens had been registered. The actual number of foreigners is considerably higher because many do not register their residence: according to mobile network data, at the end of 2024 about 79,300 foreigners lived in the city, including 68,800 citizens of Ukraine and about 4,700 citizens of Belarus. In the 2024/2025 academic year about 8,000 foreigners studied at Poznań universities, among them about 1,400 citizens of Belarus (the second group after Ukrainians, with 2,600); Belarusians made up 21.2% of foreign students enrolled in full degree programmes. Belarusian citizens also made up 13% of foreign pupils in Poznań schools.

== History ==
=== Grand Duchy of Lithuania and the Polish–Lithuanian Commonwealth ===
A page of the Tale of Tristan from a 1580s manuscript held in the Raczyński Library in Poznań

From the 15th to the first half of the 17th century Poznań traded with towns of present-day Belarus. According to the historian Leon Koczy, trade links with Brest were established by Jews from that town, who came to Poznań as merchants as early as the 15th century; at the turn of the 15th and 16th centuries merchants from Brest stood out among the Jewish traders from the Grand Duchy of Lithuania who dealt with Poznań; direct contacts of Poznań Jews with Brest and Pinsk ceased in the second half of the 16th century, probably because trade moved to the Lublin fairs. In the 16th and first half of the 17th century furs were supplied to Poznań Jewish wholesalers by merchants from Mogilev, Slutsk and Minsk, and Poznań records mention settlements at the fairs in Turaŭ. Wax from Polesia, exported via Brest, also reached Poznań, and Poznań wholesalers obtained hops from the Brest area, which they supplied to Gdańsk.

In 1529 Skaryna's brother Ivan, a Vilnius merchant who, like their father, traded in hides, died in Poznań. Francysk came to the city to settle the inheritance, and in April 1532, at the suit of his brother's creditors, he was imprisoned in Poznań and later released by decision of King Sigismund I. The Raczyński Library holds a manuscript miscellany of the 1580s (shelfmark BR Rkp. 94) containing Old Belarusian translations of the chivalric romances Tale of Tristan and Tale of Bova as well as the most complete copy of the second redaction of the chronicles of the Grand Duchy of Lithuania. The library also keeps two volumes from Nesvizh with original letters of King Sigismund II Augustus to the Radziwiłł family, mostly to Mikołaj "the Red" Radziwiłł (shelfmarks 73 and 81), the largest surviving collection of original letters of the last Jagiellonian king.

=== Links with the Belarusian lands in the 19th century ===
Title page of Smyk biełaruski (1894), giving Poznań as the place of publication

From 1815 the governor of the Grand Duchy of Posen was Antoni Radziwiłł, who after the death of Dominik Radziwiłł took over Nesvizh and Mir by decree of Tsar Alexander I. From 1815 to 1830 his residence in Poznań was the former Jesuit college, now the seat of the city authorities.

In 1831–1832, during his stay in Greater Poland, Adam Mickiewicz, a native of the Navahrudak region, made several short visits to Poznań. At Christmas 1831 he met his elder brother Franciszek at Łukowo near Poznań; Franciszek, a participant in the November Uprising, remained in Greater Poland, living in Łukowo and later in Rożnowo, where he died in 1862.

Several sources on the history of the Grand Duchy of Lithuania were published in Poznań: Edward Raczyński issued the memoirs of Chancellor Albrycht Stanisław Radziwiłł (1839) and the autobiography of Bogusław Radziwiłł (1841), and Tytus Działyński published Zbiór praw litewskich od roku 1389 do roku 1529 (1841), which includes the text of the First Statute of Lithuania. Honorary members of the Poznań Society of Friends of Learning included natives of the lands of present-day Belarus such as Ignacy Domeyko, Leonard Chodźko, Benedykt Dybowski, Władysław Syrokomla, Włodzimierz Spasowicz and Eustachy Tyszkiewicz. In 1894 the collection Smyk biełaruski by Francišak Bahuševič appeared under the pseudonym "Symon Reŭka z-pad Barysava", with Poznań given as the place of publication on the title page; according to other sources it was actually printed in East Prussia.

The Horvat family, owners of the estate at Naroŭla, were related to the Chłapowski family of Greater Poland: Maria Horvat was the wife of Maciej Chłapowski of Czerwona Wieś, and Artur Horvat signed powers of attorney for the management of the estate in Poznań in the 1890s and in 1901. Aleksandra Horvat, from the same family, married the future senator Stanisław Wańkowicz in 1916; Wańkowicz owned the Gorzyczki estate in Kościan County, and the couple were killed by the Germans at Zbydniów in June 1943.

=== Second Polish Republic ===
According to the National Library of Belarus, in 1928 Jazep Drazdovič visited an exhibition in Poznań with pupils of the Navahrudak Belarusian Gymnasium.

=== Polish People's Republic ===
On 1–3 October 1955 a delegation of the Byelorussian SSR led by the republic's minister of culture, Ryhor Kisialioŭ, visited Poznań; on 2 October Days of Belarusian Culture were formally opened in the hall of Poznań University. In 1968 volume 52, Białoruś – Polesie, containing Belarusian folklore material collected by Oskar Kolberg, appeared in his Dzieła wszystkie series published in Wrocław and Poznań. On 21 April 1975 the Belarusian ensemble Pesniary performed in the hall of Adam Mickiewicz University as part of the Days of Soviet Culture.

== Organisations and initiatives ==
In 2003 the association Białoruskie Kulturalno-Naukowe Centrum w Poznaniu (Belarusian Cultural and Scientific Centre in Poznań) was registered in the city; its co-founder and chairman was Vitaĺ Voranaŭ. From 28 February to 2 March 2012 the centre sponsored a Festival of Belarusian Culture with a lecture on Belarusian cuisine, a film screening, a popular-science conference, a staged reading of plays by Belarusian playwrights, an evening of Belarusian music and a photo exhibition.

After 2020 Poznań became one of the main centres of Belarusian cultural initiatives in Poland. Organisations active in the city include the community space Pakoj 202, the art space Grey Mandorla Studio founded by Siarhiej Šabochin, the research platform Kalektar, which runs an artist residency in Poznań, and the multicultural foundation Dzieja, which organises concerts by Belarusian performers. The bar MY, opened in August 2020 on Fredry Street, became one of the hubs of the young Belarusian diaspora; it later moved next to the Teatr Polski and was renamed MY pod sceną. Its name and décor refer to Yevgeny Zamyatin's novel We; it hosts concerts by Belarusian musicians, exhibitions of contemporary Belarusian artists and stand-up comedy. Since 2024 the intercultural foundation Fajny Świat has worked with children, young people and families with a migration background; in 2025 its project Fajny HUB Młodzieżowy received a distinction in the city's Inicjatory competition.

The KUT foundation was founded by the Brest-born artist and cultural manager Voĺha Stryžniova and registered in January 2023; it runs cultural and social projects, including with the Belarusian community. It organises lectures in Belarusian, discussions, exhibitions and workshops and has an art studio for children. Together with the Belarusian diaspora KUT organises the Kupalle festival Paparać. In 2025 the foundation compiled a "Map of Belarusian places in Poznań", held the book festival Lorem Ipsum and, on the anniversary of the Night of Executed Poets, organised with the TeMa studio a walk around the city centre with QR codes linking to recordings of poems in Belarusian.

A Belarusian-language conversation club meets in person in the city. Since 2025 a volunteer Belarusian embroidery circle for emigrants has been active, and since July 2024 the Barak Kultury foundation has hosted Viečaročki, meetings devoted to the Belarusian language and culture.

== Theatre ==
Belarusian theatre in the city is represented by the TeMa theatre workshops studio (founded 2023), the Diafilm Live project and the children's theatre project Kazaczki baj!. The playwright and director Mikita Iĺinčyk staged Pygmalion at the Teatr Polski.

Since 2024 the Poznań foundation Barak Kultury has held an annual Belarusian–Ukrainian–Polish theatre festival, Druga Próba. Teatr ponad granicami ("Second Attempt. Theatre Across Borders"), for artists with a migration background, mainly from Belarus and Ukraine. Its initiator and curator of performative readings is the Belarusian director Valiancina Maroz; its partners are the Raczyński Library and the Teatr Ósmego Dnia. The 2025 festival (16–20 September) opened with the premiere of Maroz's production Say Hi to Abdo, based on a play by Mikita Iĺinčyk and performed in Belarusian. The third festival (11–19 September 2026) opened with Natallia Liavanava's A Bee in the Throat and closed with Refugees 1915 by BY Teatr; according to a review, the audience included not only the Belarusian and Ukrainian diaspora but also local theatregoers.

== Music and dance ==
Since August 2022 the amateur Belarusian choir Poznański Śpieŭny Schod has been active in the city; it rehearses at Barak Kultury, which provides space for Belarusian initiatives, and recorded the song "Kudy i kali" with Liavon Voĺski for the album Emihranty. In 2024 the choir had more than 50 members; on 16 November 2024, at the third national Musica Patriae festival of choral patriotic song in Poznań, it received the Srebrne Pasmo (Silver Band) in the mixed choirs category and the organiser's cup. A crowdfunding campaign for the choir's own album of choral arrangements of well-known Belarusian songs was completed in November 2024; the album was released on streaming platforms in early 2026.

Since 2024 workshops of Belarusian folk dances, Tancy ŭ Paznańcy, have been held.

The Kupalle festival Paparać, organised by KUT with the Belarusian diaspora, was held in its first two years on the bank of the Warta in the city centre. On 5 July 2025, at the second festival on Warto beach, Belarusian musicians including Viačaslaŭ Kmit, Applepicker and Zui performed, alongside workshops and presentations of Belarusian community initiatives. In 2026, co-organised with the Logos organisation, the festival took place at Lake Lednica.

On 26 January 2025 Poznań was one of four Polish cities to host the simultaneous Belarus Outside Sound System festival.

== Literature and books ==
Since December 2023 the city has had a Belarusian lending library, Knižnaja palička ŭ Poznani; on 23 August 2025 it opened at the Migrant Info Point (11 Karola Marcinkowskiego Avenue). Since September 2024 a book club has met at the Belarusian conversation club.

In 2024 and 2025 Poznań hosted the PRADMOVA festival of intellectual books: on 30 November – 1 December 2024 and on 7–9 November 2025. Partners of the 2025 festival included the Belarusian school in Poznań, the Faculty of Modern Languages of Adam Mickiewicz University, Barak Kultury, MY pod sceną and the Teatr Ósmego Dnia.

On 19–26 September 2025 KUT and the publisher Skaryna Press held the Lorem Ipsum book festival in Poznań, dedicated to the city's Belarusian community. In 2025 Skaryna Press published Bielaruskija halasy z Poznani ("Belarusian Voices from Poznań"), a collection of interviews with Belarusians living in Poznań by Paviel Zaleski, a journalist of the Belarusian service of Polish Radio.

The publishing house RozUM Media, founded in 2025 by Paviel Liahčylaŭ, is based in Poznań and published seven books in 2025; it was presented at the 2025 PRADMOVA festival. In 2026 it published the memoirs of Franciszek Mickiewicz, Adam Mickiewicz's elder brother, in the Polish text of the 1923 edition together with a Belarusian translation by Michal Karnievič. On 13–15 March 2026 Belarusian publishers had a joint stand at the Poznań Book Fair for the first time, presenting more than a hundred titles.

== Education ==
Belarusian dialects were studied by the Poznań University professors Władysław Kuraszkiewicz, who worked there from 1950 to 1975, and Leszek Ossowski, head of the department of Russian philology from 1964. In 2025 Adam Mickiewicz University Press published an edition, edited by Andrea Mariani, of the 1773–1774 inventories of the Jesuit college in Minsk and its estates. Since 2021 Adam Mickiewicz University has admitted students to a Belarusian philology programme. According to the city administration, as of March 2021 the city, Poznań County and the Greater Poland regional government jointly funded scholarships for 55 Belarusian students at five Poznań universities. On 14 July 2023 a Belarusian Saturday school for children, teaching Belarusian language and literature, history, drawing and music, opened at the private school Akademia na Wyspie. Poznań is the seat of the Association of Belarusian Students (ZBS).

== Religion ==
Catholic masses are celebrated in Belarusian in the city; since October 2024 they have been held every Sunday at the Church of the Sacred Heart of Jesus and Our Lady of Consolation. On 29–31 May 2026 Poznań hosted the fourth congress of Belarusian Catholics in emigration, attended by more than 100 people from Poland, Germany and Lithuania.

== Sport ==
In 2010–2012 the Belarusian footballer Siarhiej Kryviec played for Lech Poznań, winning the 2010 Polish championship with the club. He returned to Poznań in 2021 as a player of Lech's reserve team, later coached at the club's academy, and in 2025 joined Warta Poznań, becoming assistant coach of a youth team in July and player-coach of the reserve team in October.

Belarusian athletes have repeatedly won world championship medals on Lake Malta in Poznań. At the 2009 World Rowing Championships Kaciaryna Karsten won the single sculls. At the 2010 Canoe Sprint World Championships Belarus won seven medals, including three golds, one of them by Raman Pietrušenka and Vadzim Machnieŭ in the K-2 500 m. At the 2026 world championships Belarusian canoeists and paracanoeists again won seven medals, with Julija Truškina and Ina Niadzieĺkina winning the C-2 200 m.

== People born in present-day Belarus associated with Poznań ==
- Michalina Stefanowska (1855 Grodno – 1942 Kraków) – physiologist, the first woman to obtain habilitation in Poznań (1922), professor at Poznań University
- Władysław Kowalenko (1884 Minsk – 1966) – historian, doctorate at Poznań University (1925), from 1948 head of the department of maritime history
- Włodzimierz Dworzaczek (1905 Minsk – 1988) – historian and genealogist, student (1925–1929) and from 1945 staff member of Poznań University
- Czesław Gerwel (1909 Baranavichy – 1974 Poznań) – parasitologist, founder in 1961 of the first clinic of parasitic diseases in Poland at the Poznań Medical Academy
- Benon Miśkiewicz (1930 Baranavichy – 2008 Poznań) – historian, rector of Adam Mickiewicz University (1972–1981), minister of science (1982)
- Jerzy Kopa (1943 Baranavichy – 2022 Poznań) – football coach, three times manager of Lech Poznań, Polish champion in 1990

== See also ==
- Belarusians in Poland
