= Zawisza Association of Catholic Scouting =

Scouting organization

- Membership: 7529
- Affiliation: International Union of Guides and Scouts of Europe

The Stowarzyszenie Harcerstwa Katolickiego "Zawisza" Federacja Skautingu Europejskiego ("Zawisza" Association of Catholic Scouting) of the International Union of Guides and Scouts of Europe is a Polish Scouting organization, based on the Scouting of French Jesuit Jacques Sevin, and the activities of prewar Scoutmaster Stanisław Sedlaczek.

== Background ==
Since 1995 "Zawisza" is a member of the International Union of Guides and Scouts of Europe. The organization has 7529 members as of 2024.
