= Łozice, Podlaskie Voivodeship =

Łozice
- Village
- Location within Poland
- Coordinates: 52°40′2″N 23°34′32″E
- Country: Poland
- Voivodeship: Podlaskie
- County: Hajnówka
- Gmina: Hajnówka
- Population: 40

Łozice [wɔˈʑit͡sɛ] is a village in the administrative district of Gmina Hajnówka, within Hajnówka County, Podlaskie Voivodeship, in north-eastern Poland, close to the border with Belarus.
