= Zaleszany, Hajnówka County =

Zaleszany
- Village
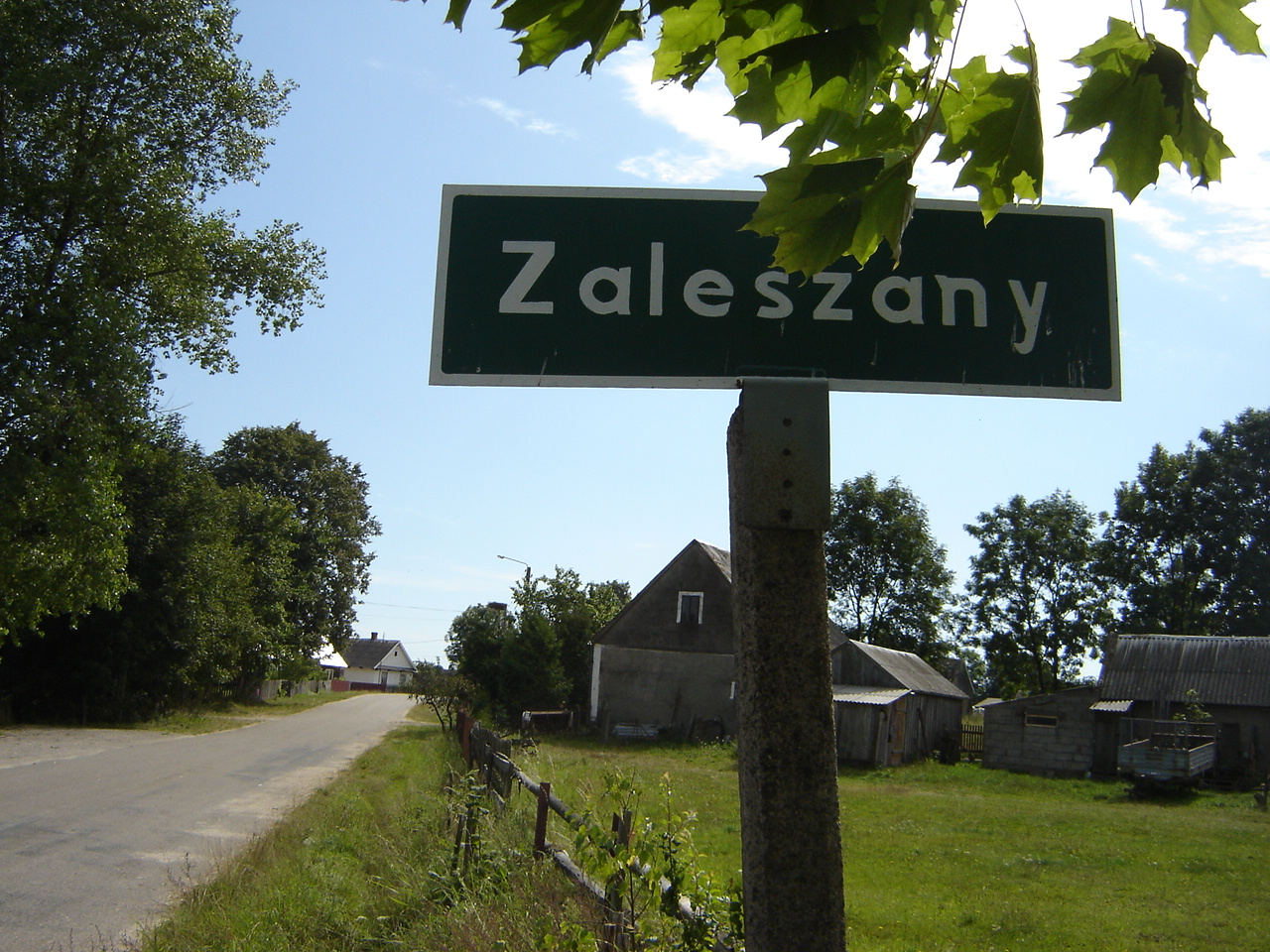
- Village entrance sign

- Location within Poland
- Coordinates: 52°39′N 23°20′E
- Country: Poland
- Voivodeship: Podlaskie
- County: Hajnówka
- Gmina: Kleszczele

Zaleszany [zalɛˈʂanɨ] is a village in the administrative district of Gmina Kleszczele, within Hajnówka County, Podlaskie Voivodeship, in north-eastern Poland, close to the border with Belarus.

Formerly within Białystok Voivodeship (1945–75), it was in an area of paramilitary armed attacks from 1945 to 1946 as part of anti-communist resistance. In 1946, ethnic Belarusian Polish citizens were attacked in this area: Zaleszany was among several villages destroyed, and a total of 79 civilians were killed. A memorial to these events and their victims was erected in Zaleszany. In 1995 the government investigated the events, interviewing families of victims and associates of the partisans. None of the latter identified as responsible for the crimes was still living.
