= Końcowizna =

- Village
- Location within Poland
- Coordinates: 52°55′48″N 22°58′27″E
- Country: Poland
- Voivodeship: Podlaskie
- County: Białystok
- Gmina: Suraż

Końcowizna [kɔɲt͡sɔˈvizna] is a village in the administrative district of Gmina Suraż, within Białystok County, Podlaskie Voivodeship, in north-eastern Poland.
