= Szpaki, Podlaskie Voivodeship =

Szpaki
- Village
- Location within Poland
- Coordinates: 52°49′N 22°59′E
- Country: Poland
- Voivodeship: Podlaskie
- County: Bielsk
- Gmina: Wyszki
- Postal code: 17-132
- Vehicle registration: BBI

Szpaki [ˈʂpakʲi] is a village in the administrative district of Gmina Wyszki, within Bielsk County, Podlaskie Voivodeship, in north-eastern Poland.

Four Polish citizens were murdered by Nazi Germany in the village during World War II.
