= Buddhism in Poland =

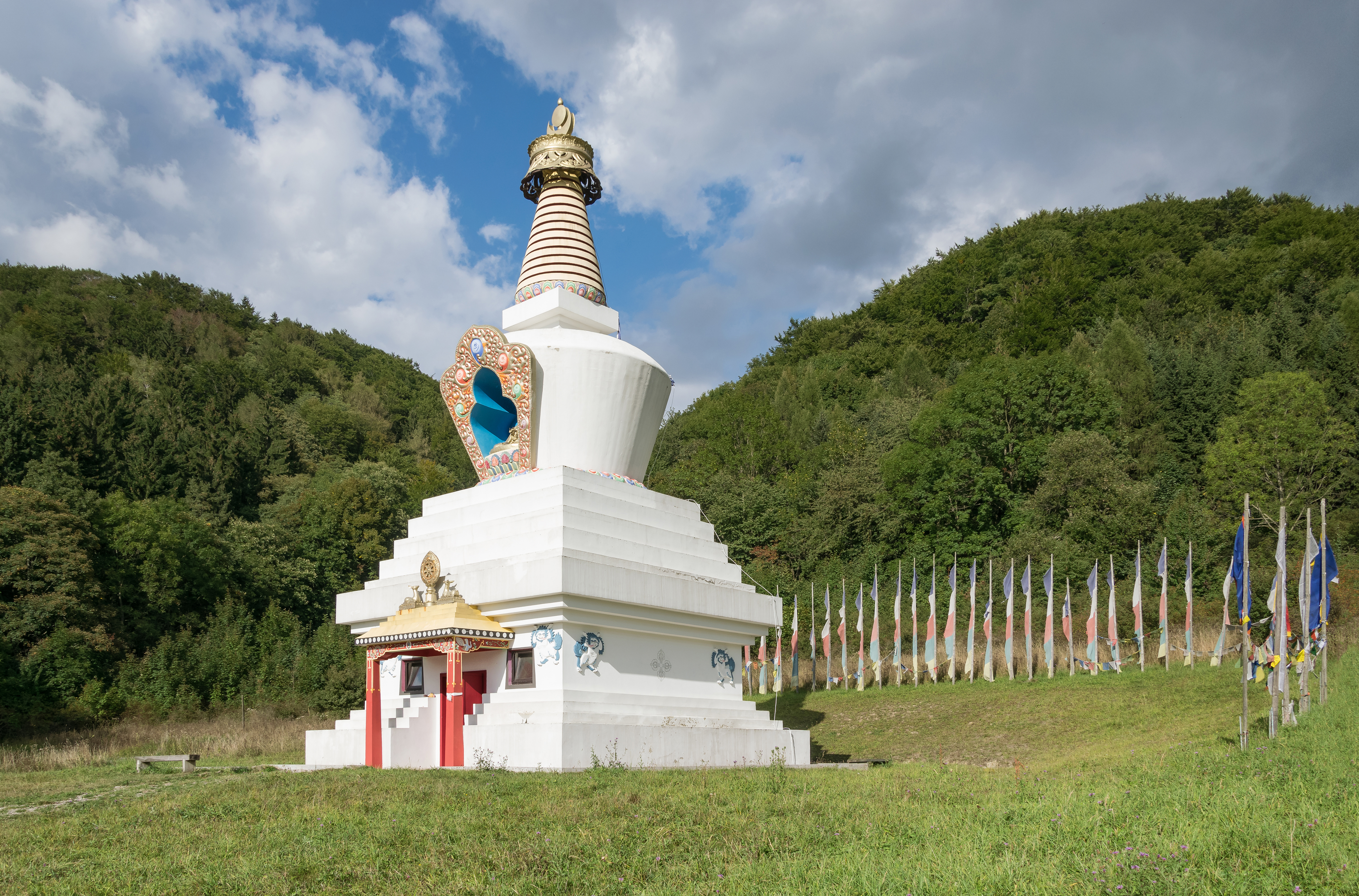
Stupa in Darnków

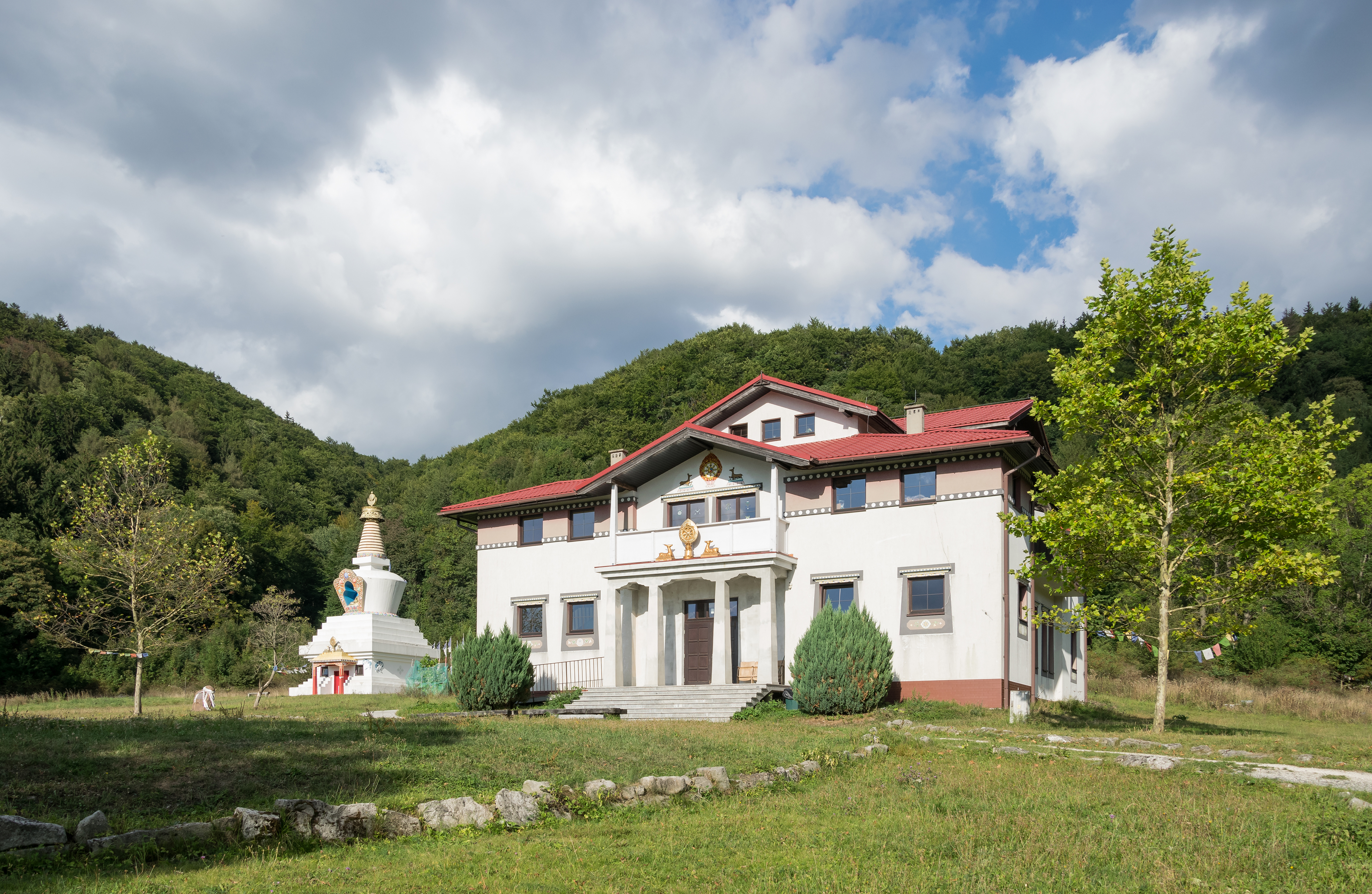
Gompa Drophan Ling in Darnków

The roots of Buddhism in Poland can be found in the early 20th century in the nation's connections to the origin countries of the religion, like Vietnam, China, Japan, and Korea. After World War II, primarily expatriate Poles joined various Buddhist groups and organizations. Since the breakdown of the Eastern Bloc, which had promoted an antireligious campaign, Buddhism has been able to develop further in the more tolerant atmosphere.

Today all of the principal schools of Buddhism including Mahayana (Zen and Jodo Shinshu) and Tibetan Buddhism can be found in Poland. Movements like the Triratna Buddhist Community are also active in the country. Umbrella organizations like the Buddhist mission (Misja Buddyjska) and the Buddhist Union of Poland unite more than two dozen groups of Buddhists. The Diamond Way centers founded and directed by Lama Ole Nydahl are also active in Poland. Nydahl gave teachings on Buddhism to audiences in Poland twice every year since his first visit in 1976.

== History ==
The roots of Buddhism in Poland go back to the beginning of the 20th century and are related to the sudden fascination of Poles with the religions and culture of China, Japan, Tibet and Korea. Polish orientalists referred to Buddhism in scientific journals. One of the most famous was Andrzej Gawroński (1885-1927), who held the position of professor of Sanskrit at the University of Lwów. In addition to articles written for numerous journals, he was the author of two works that have gained the rank of classic in Poland: "Studies about Sanskrit Buddhist Literature" ("Studies on Buddhist literature in Sanskrit", Kraków, 1919) and "Sanskrit handbook" (Krakow, 1932). Stanisław Franciszek Michalski, a lecturer at the University of Łódź, contributed to the study of the Pali language. He translated the Dhammapada in 1925, supplementing the text with a long commentary and a general overview of Buddhism. He also translated "Buddhism" by Rhys Davids (Warsaw-Krakow, 1912) and left behind an unfinished grammar of the Pali language.

Professor of Indian philosophy at the University of Warsaw, Stanisław Schayer, was the founder of the Institute of Oriental Studies in Warsaw and co-editor of the Polish Bulletin of Oriental Studies ("Polski Biuletyn Orientalistyczny", 1937–1939). He studied the philosophy of mahāyana and thanks to his participation in international conferences he was also known abroad. His interests included not only Pali and Sanskrit texts, but also Tibetan scriptures .

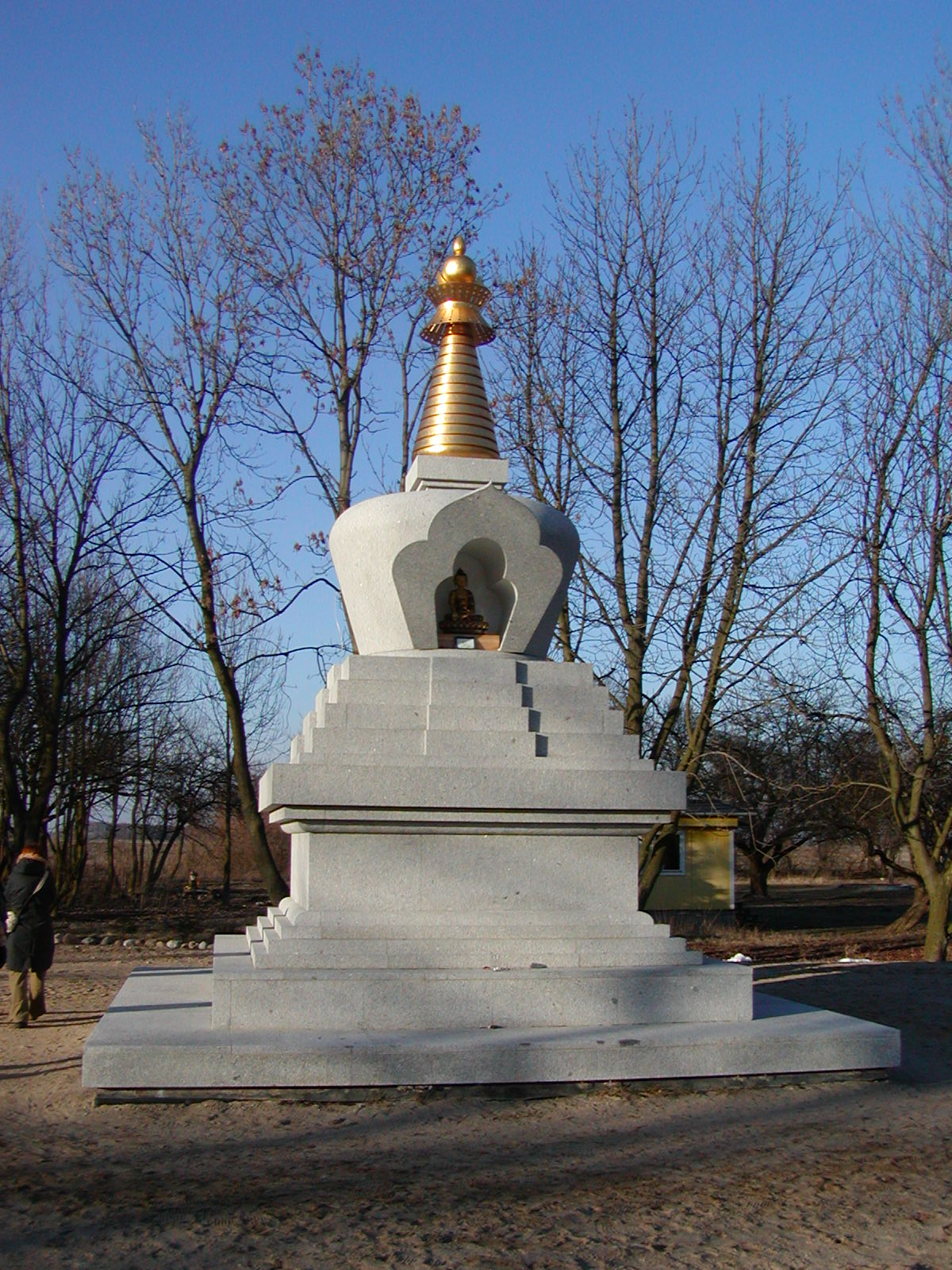
Stupa in Kuchary

The first Buddhist group in Poland was organized by Piotr Boniński from Gliwice and Władysław Misiewicz from Radom in 1949, when they founded the Circle of Friends of Buddhism in Radom. Boniński was very active in translating Buddhist texts (about 140 translations of suttas, based on the German translation), enabling a wider audience to get acquainted with the Dhamma. His premature death in 1968 caused a significant slowdown in the spread of Buddhism in Poland. Misiewicz was the editor of the Buddhist magazine "Ehi passiko" in Polish, as well as the correspondent of the Pala Buddhist Union, based at Gwardii Ludowej 12/23, in Radom. In 1961, he translated "The Word of the Buddha" by Nyanatiloka (Ed. People of Good Will, USA, 1961) with the support of Teofil Drobny.

Only at the turn of the 1960s and 1970s, a group of people associated with the studio of painters Urszula Broll and Andrzej Urbanowicz, at ul. Piastowska 1 in Katowice, on the path of her artistic and spiritual explorations, she began to practice meditation. The direct inspiration was "The Three Pillars of Zen" edited by Philip Kapleau. This book arrived at the studio in 1967. In December 1971, joint weekly meditation meetings began. The first informal leader of the group was Henryk Waniek. In 1973, Andrzej Urbanowicz completed several years of experimenting with LSD. He had an experience after which, he said, everything except Buddhism made no sense to him. In February 1974, the inaugural issue of the first Buddhist periodical in the Polish People's Republic is published. The first four notebooks were titled "The Way" and the next "The Way of Zen". The anonymity common to the illegal publishing activities of the time was broken. Urszula and Andrzej are the publishers of the first issues, with the address Piastowska 1 Katowice. In August 1974, in Kamieńczyk in the Świętokrzyskie Mountains, Andrzej Urbanowicz organized a 5-day group zazen based on sessin (an intense period of meditation practiced in Zen monasteries). A group that identifies with Buddhism is formed and later transforms into the Circle of Zen. Andrzej Urbanowicz brings Buddhism to life in Poland. A year later, in August 1975, at the invitation of Urszula and Andrzej, Zen teacher Philip Kapleau came to Poland. Over time, people associated with the group on Piastowska initiate the formation of new Buddhist groups.

In May 2000, the XIV Dalai Lama Tenzin Gyatso opened a Buddhist department in the Pomeranian Library in Szczecin.

The "Diamond Way Buddhist Association of the Karma Kagyu Lineage" (Buddyjski Związek Diamentowej Drogi Linii Karma Kagyu) is a religious association registered in Poland on January 27, 1984. On April 7, 1990, it entered into the register of churches and other religious associations kept by the Ministry of Interior and Administration.

== See also ==
- Gompa Drophan Ling
- Religion in Poland
