= Religion in Poland =

Religion in Poland (2021 census)
1. Catholicism (71.4%)
2. Other Christians (1.02%)
3. No religion (6.87%)
4. Other religions (0.14%)
5. Undeclared (20.6%)
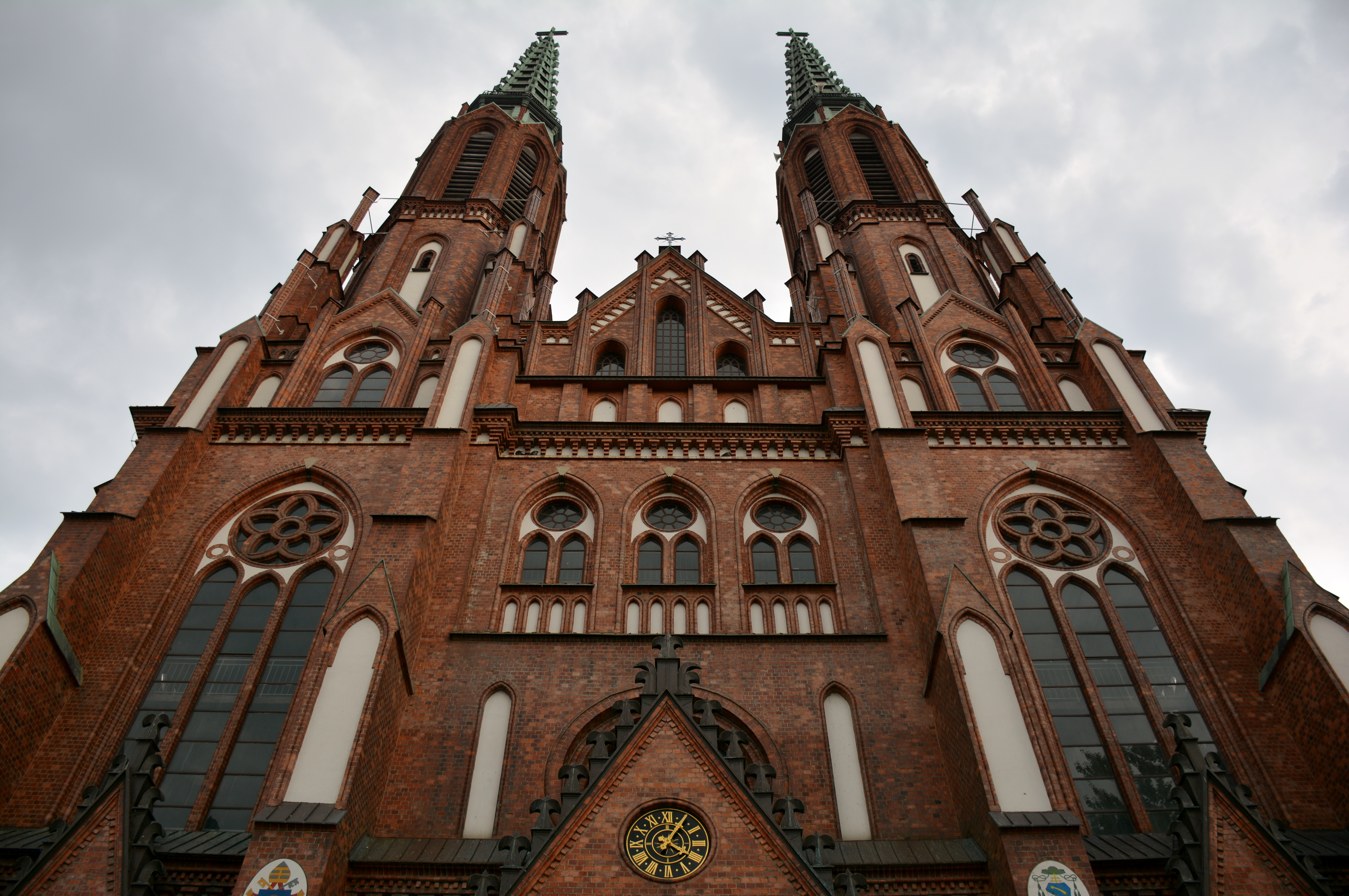

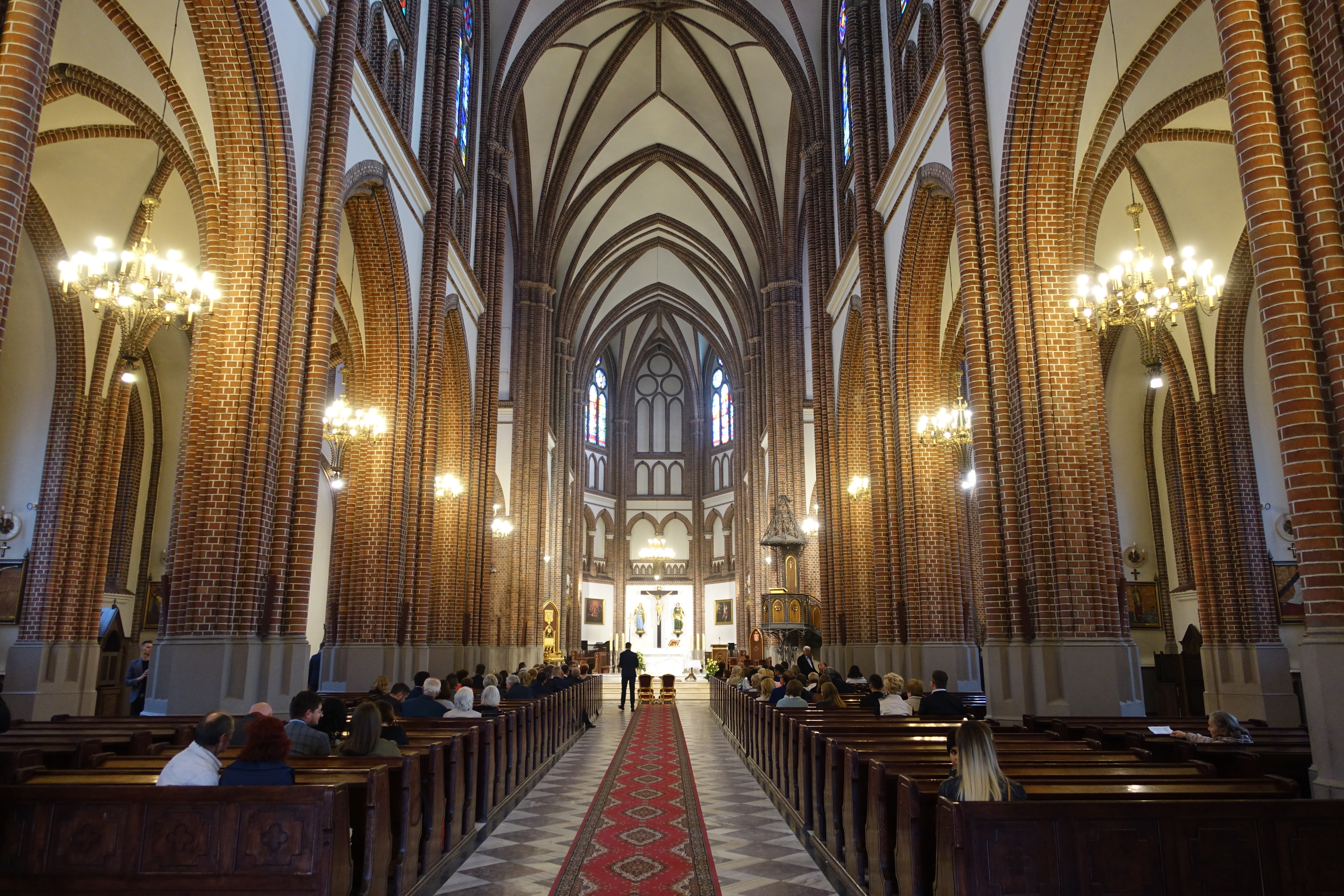
St. Florian's Roman Catholic Cathedral in Warsaw. A large majority of ethnic Poles are adherents of the Catholic branch of Christianity.

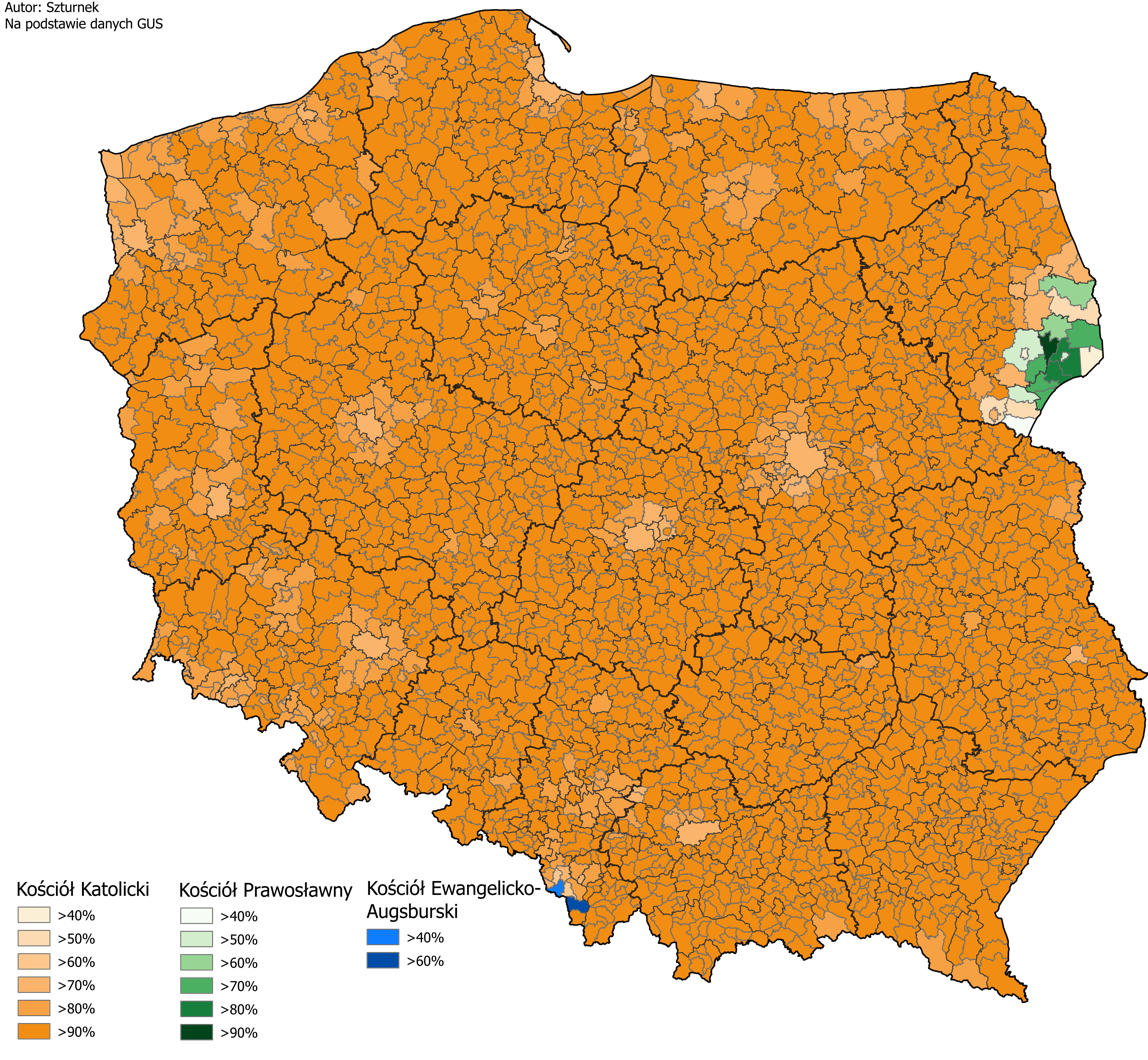
Map of the dominant religion denomination in individual gminas based on the 2021 census. The percentage refers to people who did not refuse to answer the question about their faith. Legend Catholic Church Orthodox Church Evangelical Church

Religion in Poland is rapidly declining, although historically it had been one of the most Catholic countries in the world.

According to a 2018 report by the Pew Research Center, the nation was the most rapidly secularizing of over a hundred countries measured, "as measured by the disparity between the religiosity of young people and their elders." The rate of decline has been described as "devastating" the former social prestige and political influence that the Catholic Church in Poland once enjoyed. Most Poles adhere to Roman Catholicism. 71.3% of the population identified themselves as such in the 2021 census, down from 87.6% in 2011. According to church statistics, approximately 28% of Catholics attend mass weekly. The church's reputation has declined significantly in response to sexual abuse scandals, its support of a near-total abortion ban in Poland, and close ties to the Law and Justice party, often considered its de facto political proxy in the country.

The current extent of this numerical dominance results largely from The Holocaust of Jews living in Poland carried out by Nazi Germany and the World War II casualties among Polish religious minorities. Its members regard it as a repository of Polish heritage and culture. The rest of the population consists mainly of Eastern Orthodox (Polish Orthodox Church – approximately 507,196 believers), various Protestant churches (the largest of which is the Evangelical Church of the Augsburg Confession in Poland, with 61,217 members) and Jehovah's Witnesses (116,935). There are about 55,000 Greek Catholics in Poland. Other religions practiced in Poland, by less than 0.1% of the population, include Islam, Judaism, Hinduism, and Buddhism.

In the 2021 census, the most common religion was Latin Catholicism, whose followers comprised 71.3% of the population, followed by the Eastern Orthodoxy with 0.4%, Jehovah's Witnesses with 0.3%, and various Protestant denominations comprising 0.4% of the Polish population and 0.1% for Greek Catholic Churches. According to Statistics Poland in 2018, 93.5% of the population was affiliated with a religion; 3.1% did not belong to any religion. Roman Catholicism comprised 91.9% of the population, with Eastern Orthodoxy at 0.9% (rising from 0.4% in 2011, caused in part by recent immigration from Ukraine).

In 2015, 61.1% of the population gave religion high to very high importance whilst 13.8% regarded religion as of little or no importance. The percentage of believers is much higher in the eastern parts of Poland.

Religion	2011 census		2021 census	
Religion	Number	%	Number	%
Christianity	34,194,133	88.79	27,550,861	72.43
–Latin Catholics	33,728,734	87.58	27,121,331	71.30
–Eastern Orthodox	156,284	0.41	151,648	0.40
–Jehovah's Witnesses	137,308	0.36	108,754	0.29
–Lutherans	70,766	0.18	65,407	0.17
–Greek Catholics	33,281	0.09	33,209	0.09
–Pentecostals	26,433	0.07	30,105	0.08
–Mariavites	9,990	0.03	12,248	0.03
–Polish Catholics	8,807	0.02	6,942	0.02
–Baptists	5,982	0.02	5,181	0.01
–Seventh-day Adventists	4,947	0.01	3,129	0.01
–Other Christians	11,601	0.03	12,907	0.03
Buddhism	4,817	0.01	3,236	0.01
Islam	4,593	0.01	2,209	0.01
Other religions	18,408	0.05	44,694	0.12
No religion	929,420	2.41	2,611,506	6.87
Undeclared	3,360,451	8.73	7,823,612	20.57
Total	38,511,822	100.00	38,036,118	100.00

== History ==
For centuries the ancient West Slavic and Lechitic peoples inhabiting the lands of modern-day Poland have practiced various forms of paganism known as Rodzimowierstwo (“native faith”). From the beginning of its statehood, different religions coexisted in Poland. With the baptism of Poland in 966, the old pagan religions were gradually eradicated over the next few centuries during the Christianization of Poland. However, this did not put an end to pagan beliefs in the country. The persistence was demonstrated by a series of rebellions known as the Pagan reaction in the first half of the 11th century, which also showed elements of a peasant uprising against landowners and feudalism, and led to a mutiny that destabilized the country. By the 13th century Catholicism had become the dominant religion throughout the country. Nevertheless, Christian Poles coexisted with a significant Jewish segment of the population.

In the 15th century, the Hussite Wars and the pressure from the papacy led to religious tensions between Catholics and the emergent Hussite and subsequent Protestant community, particularly after the Edict of Wieluń (1424). The Protestant movement gained a significant following in Poland and, though Roman Catholicism retained a dominant position within the state, the liberal Warsaw Confederation (1573) guaranteed wide religious tolerance. But the Counter-Reformation's reactionary movement succeeded in reducing the scope for tolerance by the late 17th and early 18th century – as evidenced by events such as the Tumult of Toruń (1724).

When Poland was divided between its neighbors in the late eighteenth century, some Poles were subjected to religious discrimination in the newly expanded German Prussia and Russia.

Prior to the Second World War, some 3,500,000 Polish Jews (about 10% of the national population) lived in the Polish Second Republic, largely in cities. Between the Germano-Soviet invasions of Poland and the end of World War II, over 90% of Jews in Poland perished. The Holocaust (called the "Shoah" in Hebrew) took the lives of more than three million mostly Ashkenazi Jews in Poland. Comparatively few managed to survive the German occupation or to escape eastward into the territories of Poland annexed by the Soviet Union, beyond the reach of the Nazi Germany. As elsewhere in Europe during the interwar period, there was both official and popular anti-Semitism in Poland, at times encouraged by the Roman Catholic Church and by some political parties (particularly the right-wing endecja and small ONR groups and factions), but not directly by the Polish government itself.

According to a 2011 survey by Ipsos MORI, 85% of the Poles remain Christians; 8% are irreligious, atheist, or agnostic; 2% adhere to unspecified other religions; and 5% did not answer the question.

According to an opinion poll conducted in "a representative group of 1,000 people" by the Centre for Public Opinion Research (CBOS), published in 2015, 39% of Poles claim they are "believers following the Church's laws", while 52% answered that they are "believers in their own understanding and way", and 5% stated that they are atheists.

== The Polish Constitution and religion ==
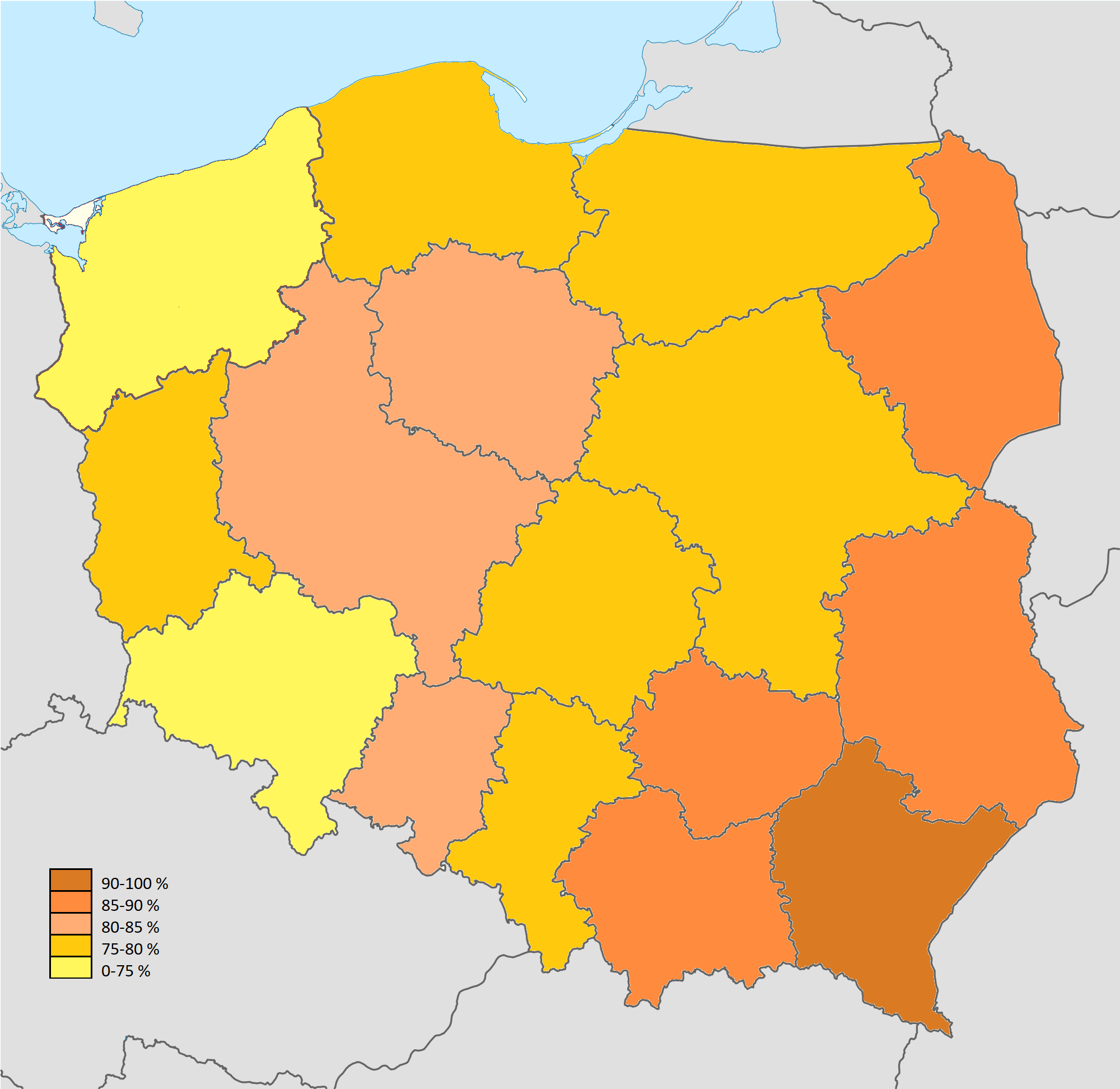
Percentage of persons who declared that they believe or very deeply believe, 2015.

The Polish Constitution assures freedom of religion for all. State and religion are formally separated in Poland. The Constitution also grants national and ethnic minorities the rights to establish educational and cultural institutions and institutions designed to protect religious identity, as well as to participate in the resolution of matters connected with their cultural identities.

Religious organizations in the Republic of Poland can register their institution with the Ministry of Interior and Administration, creating a record of churches and other religious organizations which operate under separate Polish laws. This registration is not necessary, but it does serve the laws guaranteeing freedom of religious practice.

Slavic Rodzimowiercy groups registered with the Polish authorities in 1995 are the Native Polish Church (Rodzimy Kościół Polski), which represents a pagan tradition which goes back to pre-Christian faiths and continues Władysław Kołodziej's 1921 Holy Circle of Worshipper of Światowid (Święte Koło Czcicieli Światowida), and the Polish Slavic Church (Polski Kościół Słowiański). This native Slavic religion is promoted also by the Native Faith Association (Zrzeszenie Rodzimej Wiary, ZRW), and the Association for Tradition founded in 2015.

== Major denominations ==
Around 125 faith groups and minor religions are registered in Poland. Data for 2018 provided by Główny Urząd Statystyczny, Poland's Central Statistical Office.

Denomination	Members	Leadership
Catholic Church in Poland, including: Latin; Byzantine-Ukrainian; Armenian	32,910,865; 55,000; 670	Wojciech Polak, Prymas of Poland; Stanisław Gądecki, Chairman of Polish Episcopate; Salvatore Pennacchio, Apostolic Nuncio to Poland; Jan Martyniak, Archbishop Metropolite of Byzantine-Ukrainian Rite
Polish Autocephalous Orthodox Church	507,196	Metropolitan of Warsaw Sawa
Jehovah's Witnesses in Poland	116,935	Warszawska 14, Nadarzyn Pl-05830
Evangelical-Augsburg Church in Poland	61,217	Bishop Fr. Jerzy Samiec
Pentecostal Church in Poland	25,152	Bishop Marek Kamiński
Old Catholic Mariavite Church in Poland (data from 2017)	22,849	Chief Bishop Fr. Marek Maria Karol Babi
Polish Catholic Church (Old Catholic)	18,259	Bishop Wiktor Wysoczański
Seventh-day Adventist Church in Poland	9,726	President of the Church, Ryszard Jankowski
Church of Christ in Poland	6,326	Bishop Andrzej W. Bajeński
New Apostolic Church in Poland	6,118	Bishop Waldemar Starosta
Baptist Christian Church of the Republic of Poland	5,343	President of the Church: Dr. Mateusz Wichary
Church of God in Christ	4,611	Bishop Andrzej Nędzusiak
Evangelical Methodist Church in Poland (data from 2017)	4,465	General Superintendent, Andrzej Malicki
Evangelical Reformed Church in Poland	3,335	President consistory Dr. Witold Brodziński
Catholic Mariavite Church in Poland	1,838	Bishop Damiana Maria Beatrycze Szulgowicz
The Church of Jesus Christ of Latter-day Saints in Poland	1,729	President of the Church: Russel M. Nelson Warsaw Mission President: Mateusz Turek
Islamic Religious Union in Poland	523	President of the Supreme Muslim College Stefan Korycki
Union of Jewish Religious Communities in Poland	1,860	• President of the Main Board Piotr Kadlčik • Chief Rabbi of Poland Michael Schudrich

== Selected locations ==
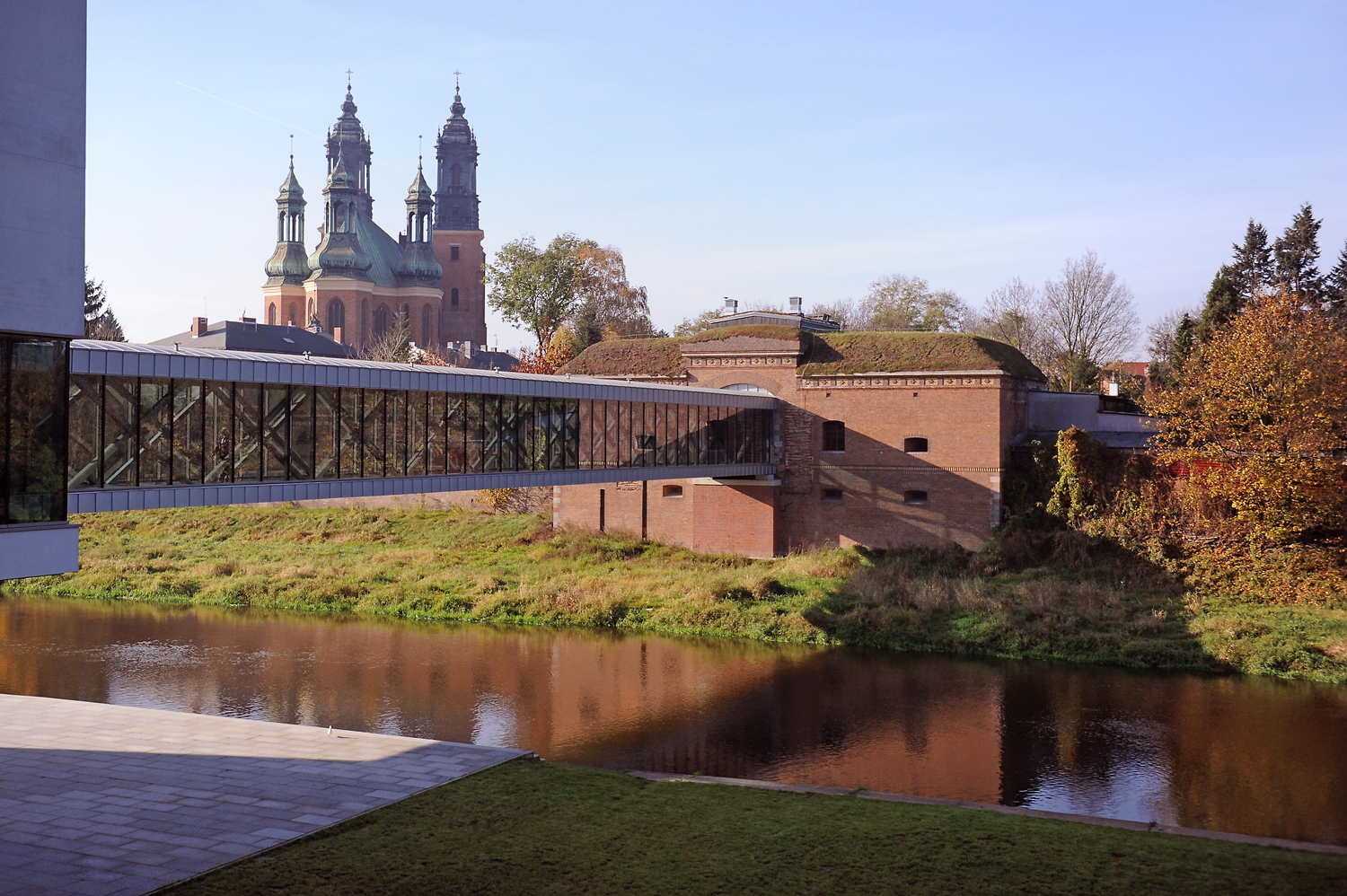
St. Peter and St. Paul Cathedral in Poznań

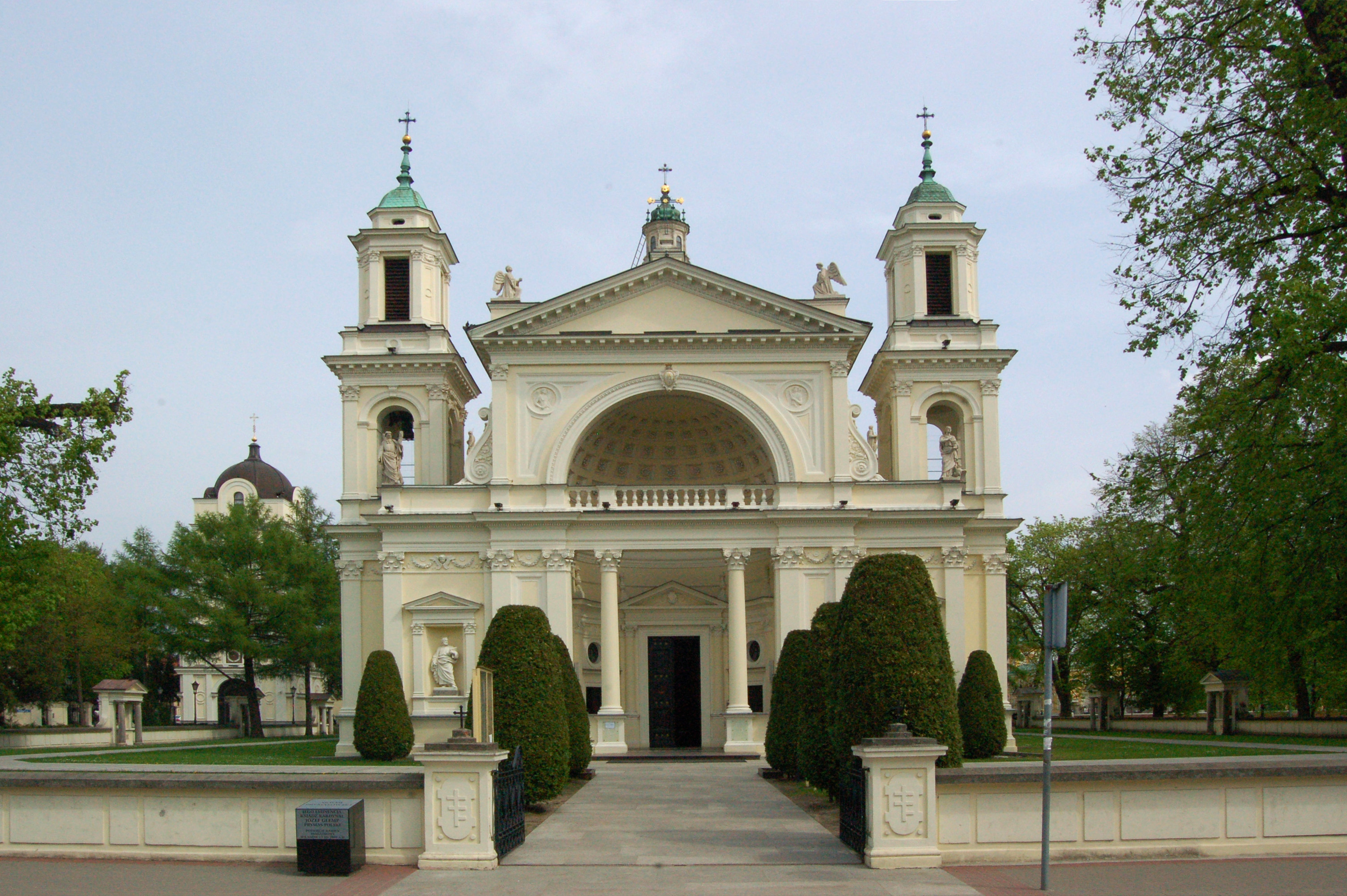
St. Anna's Catholic Church in Warsaw-Wilanów

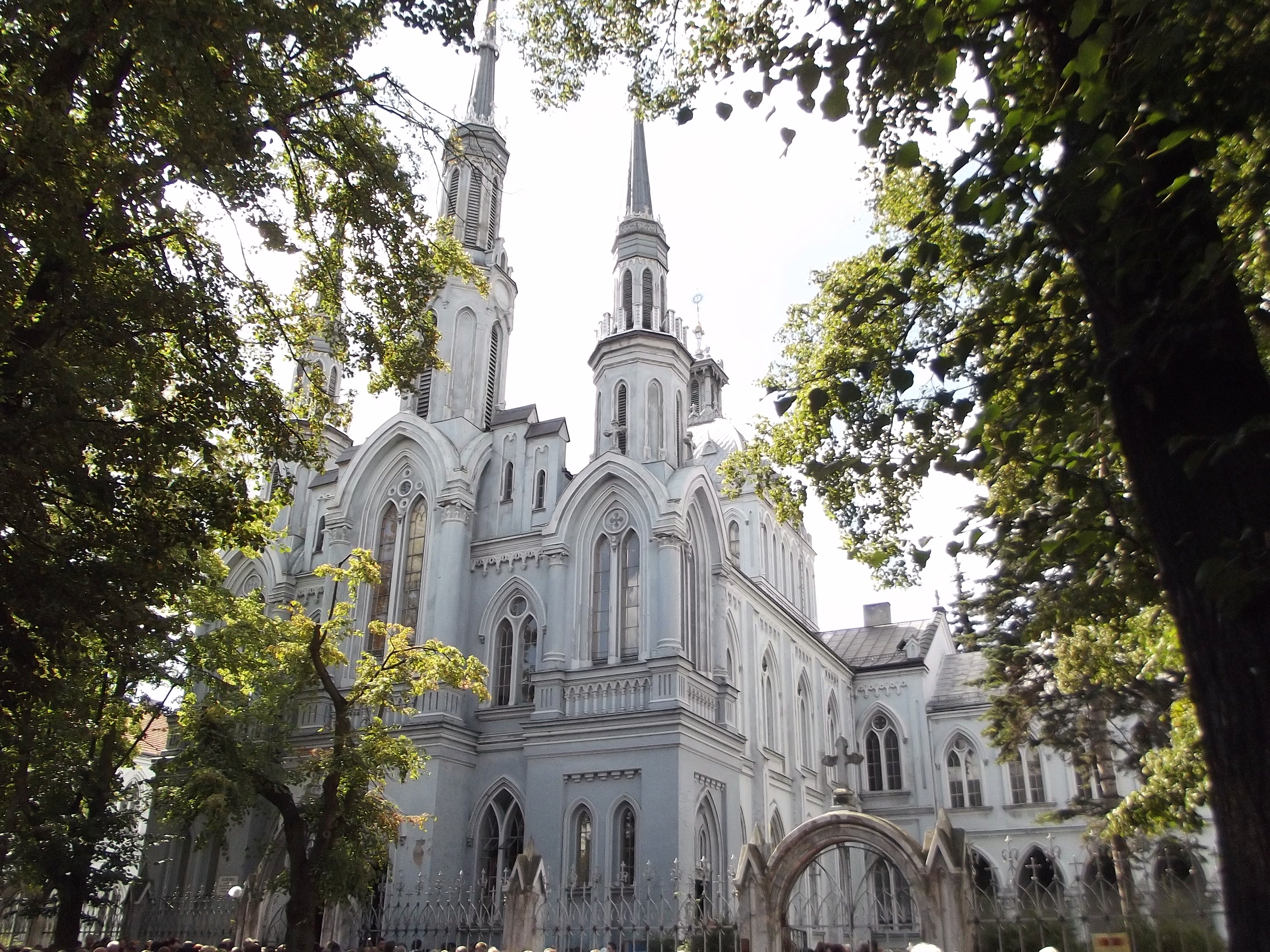
Old Catholic Mariavite Temple of Mercy and Charity in Płock

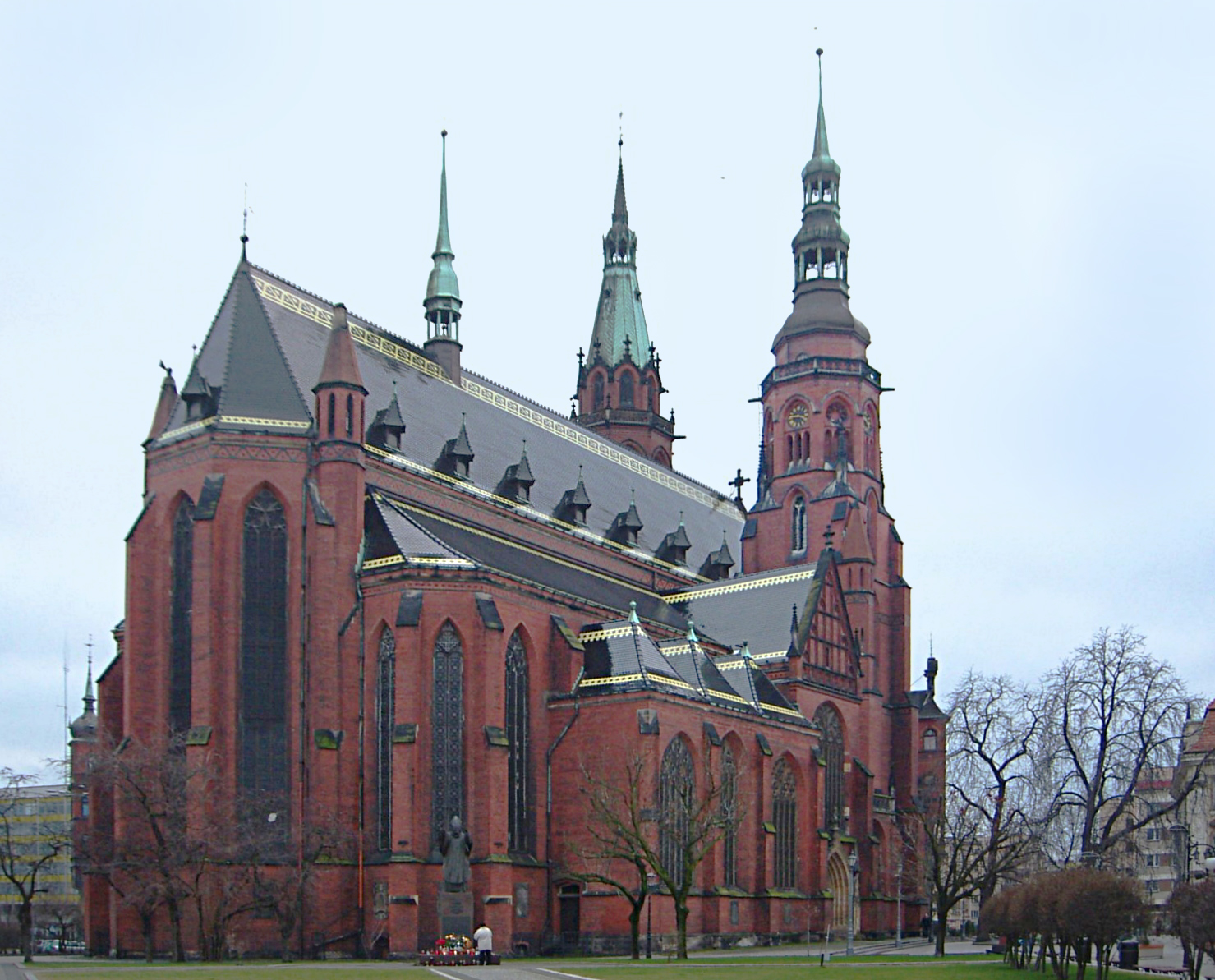
St. Peter and St. Paul Cathedral in Legnica

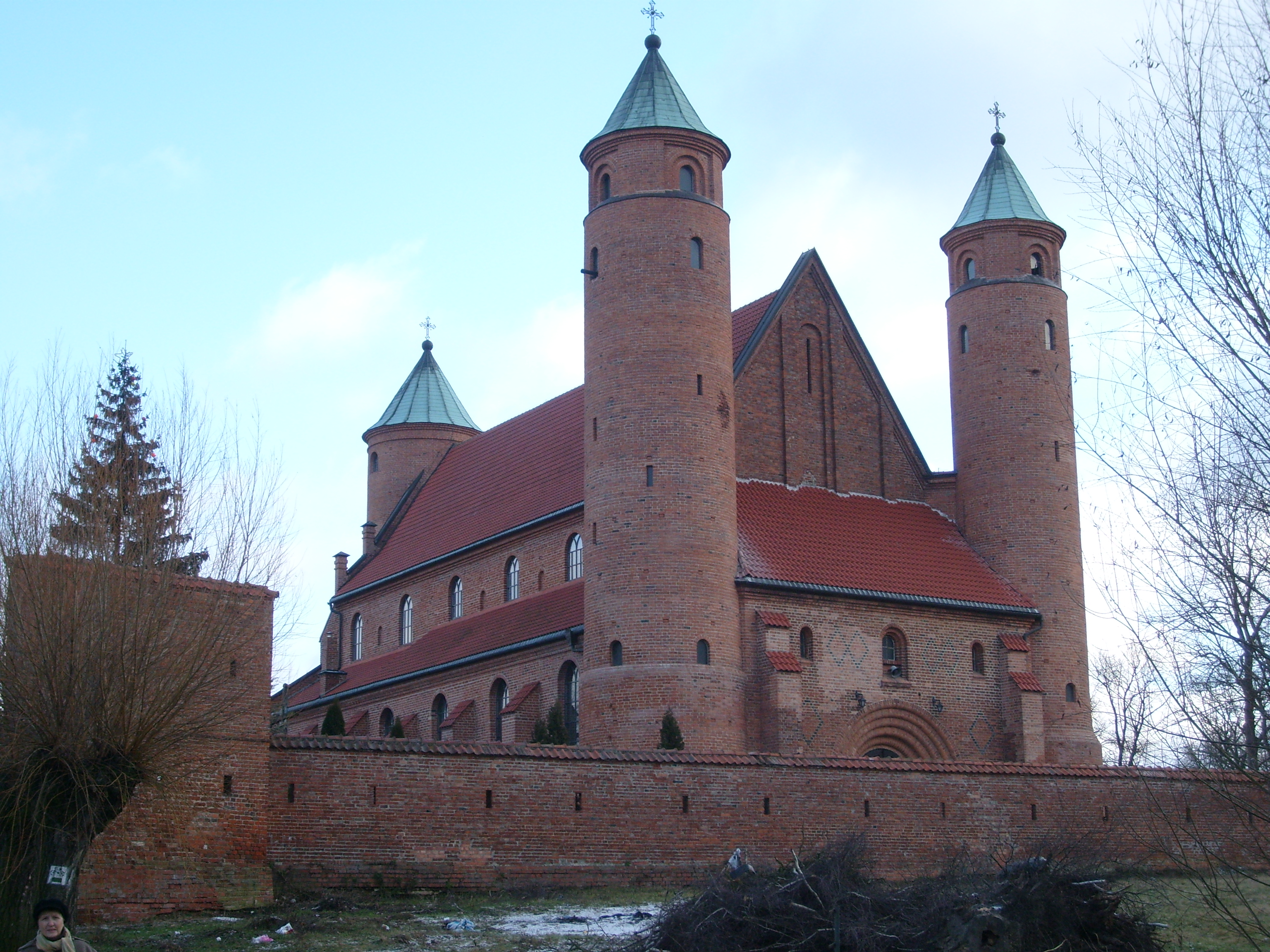
Saint Roch and John Church in Brochów

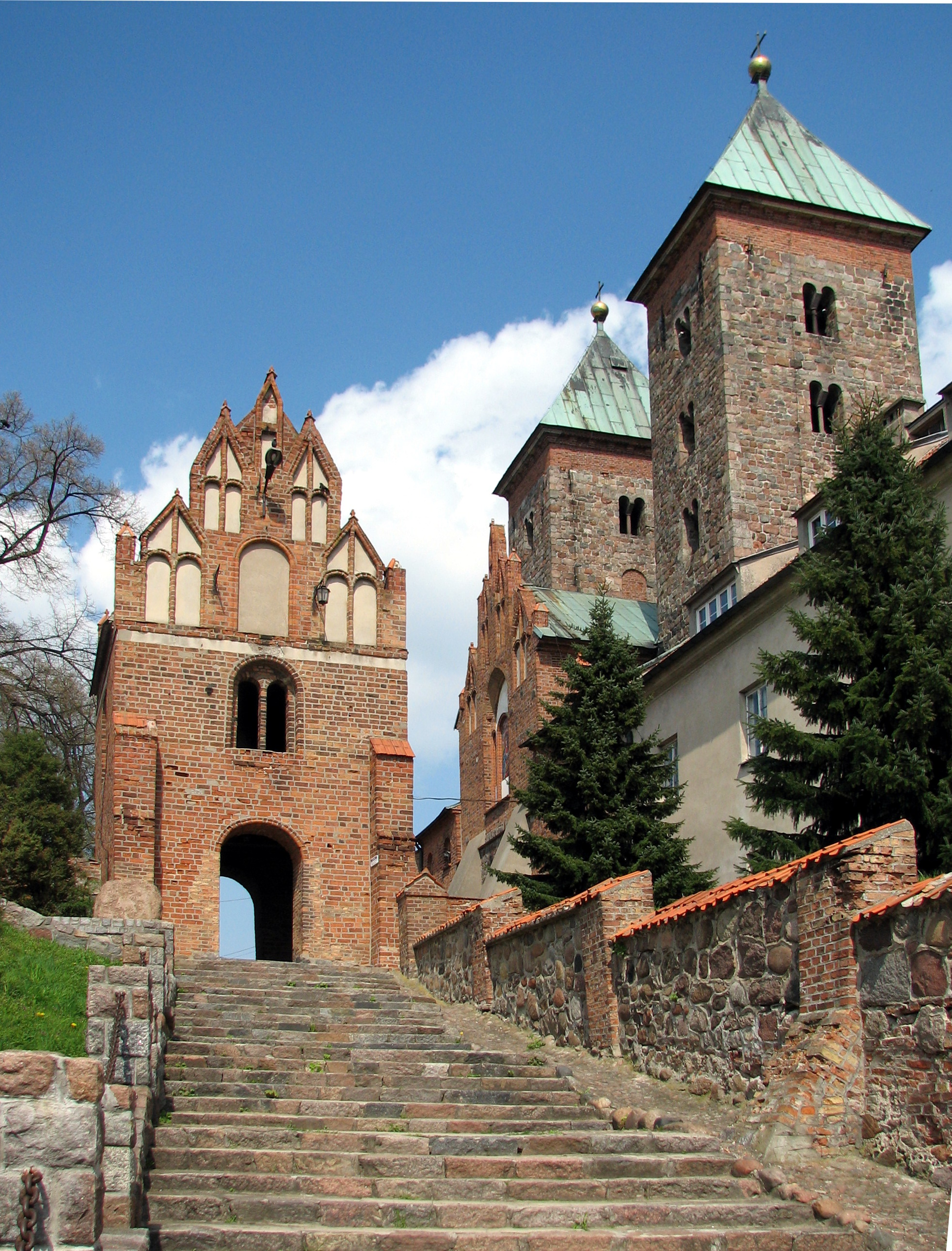
Romanesque church in Czerwińsk by Vistula river

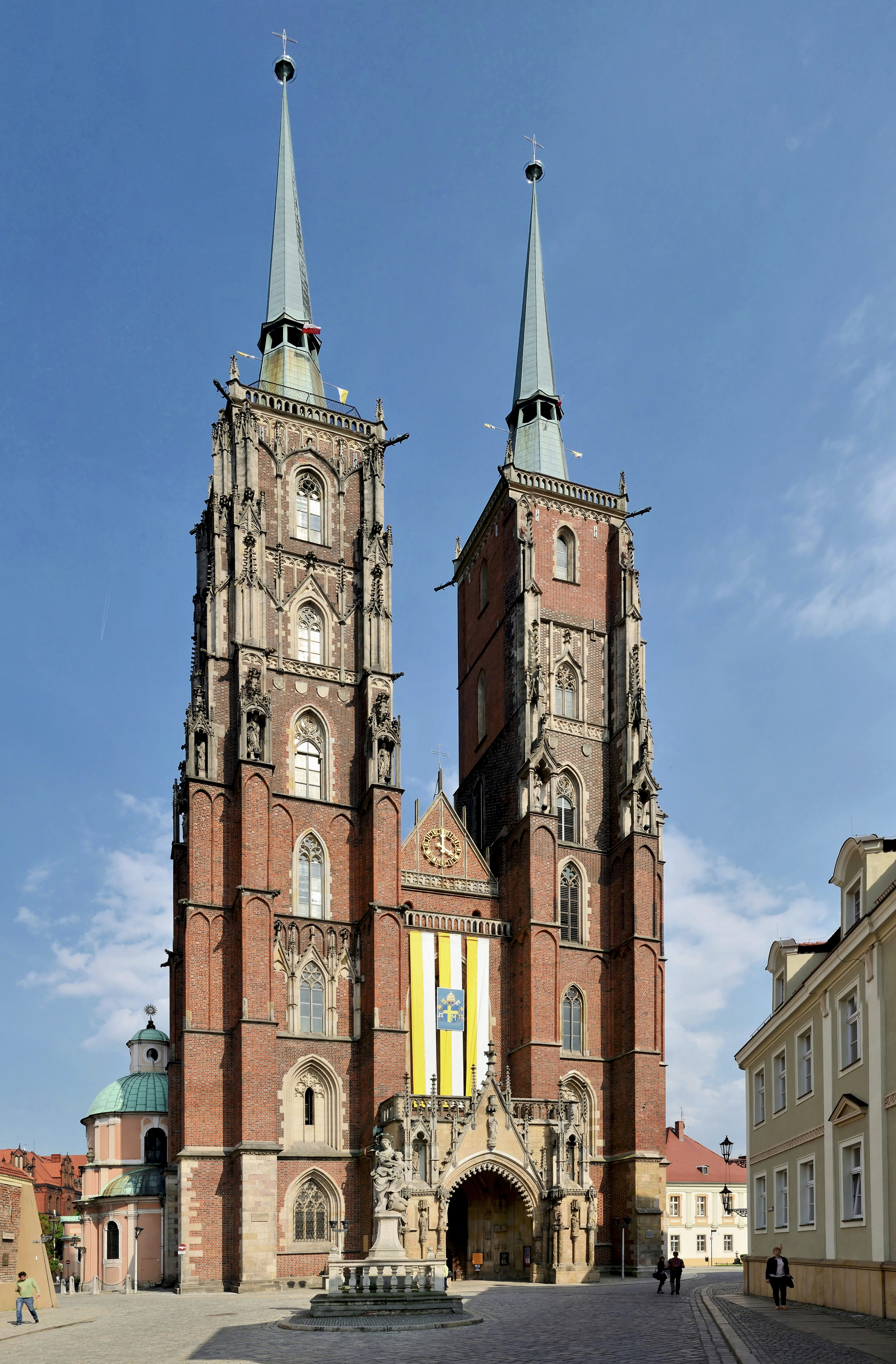
Cathedral in Wrocław

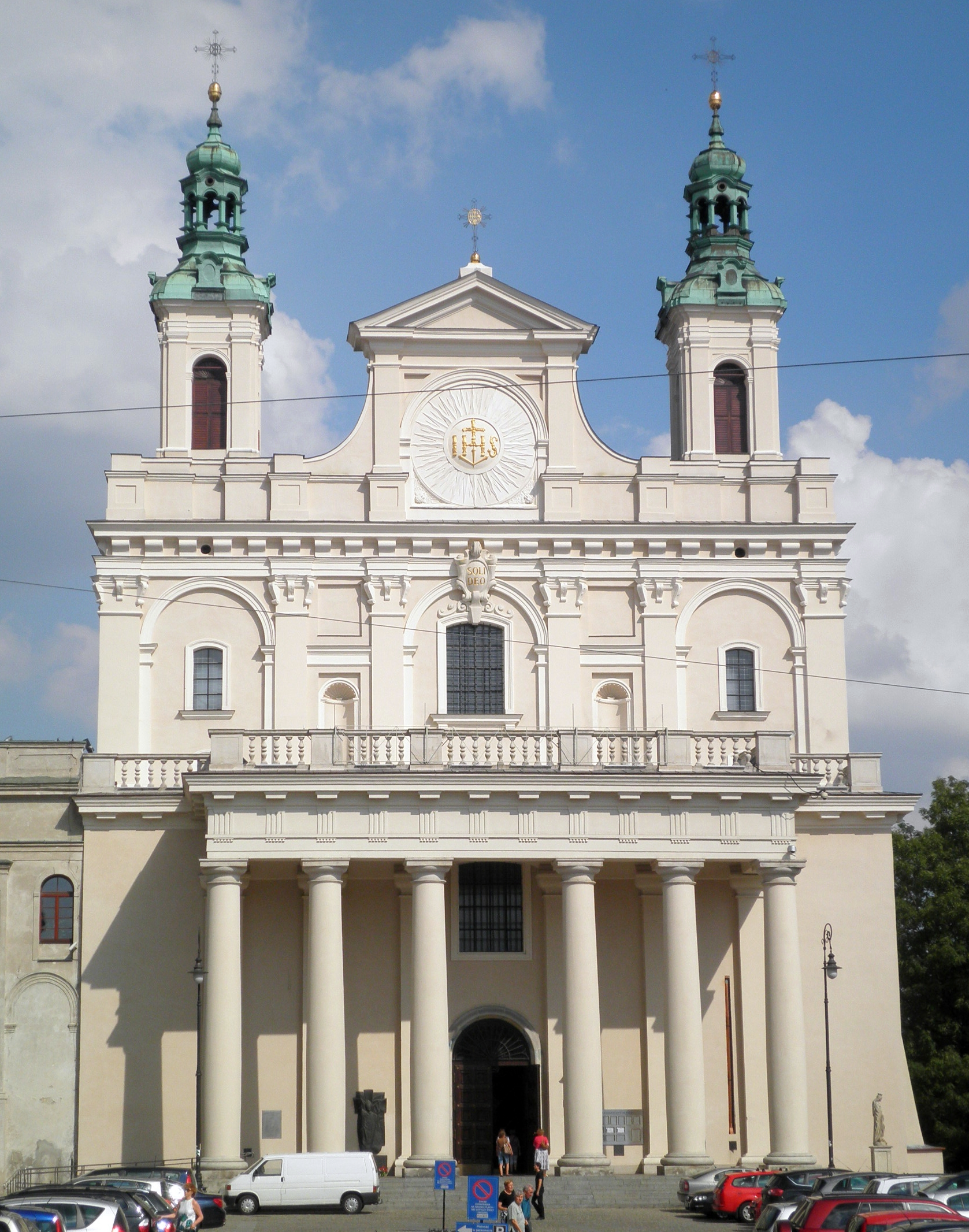
Cathedral in Lublin

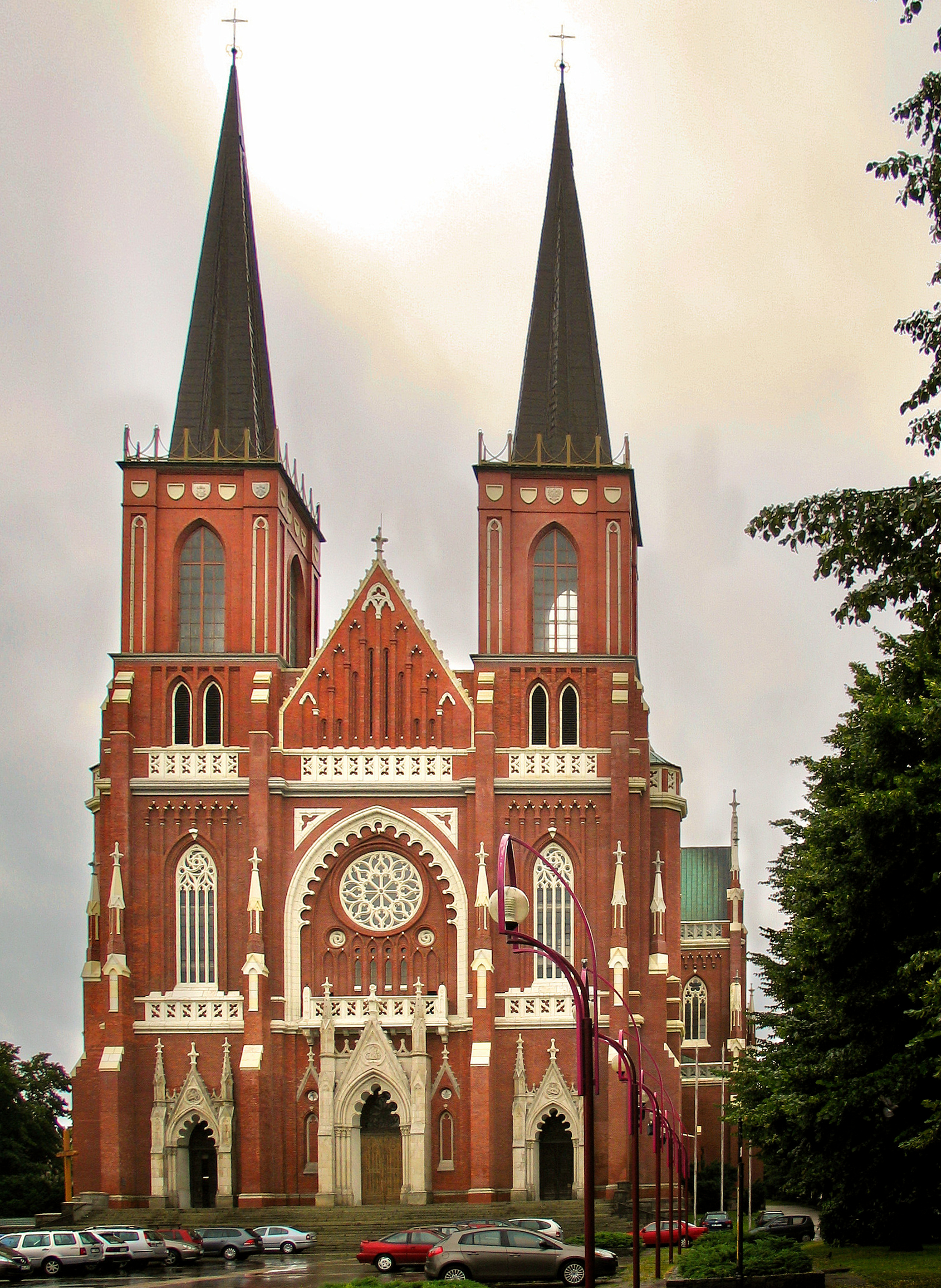
Cathedral Basilica of the Holy Family in Częstochowa

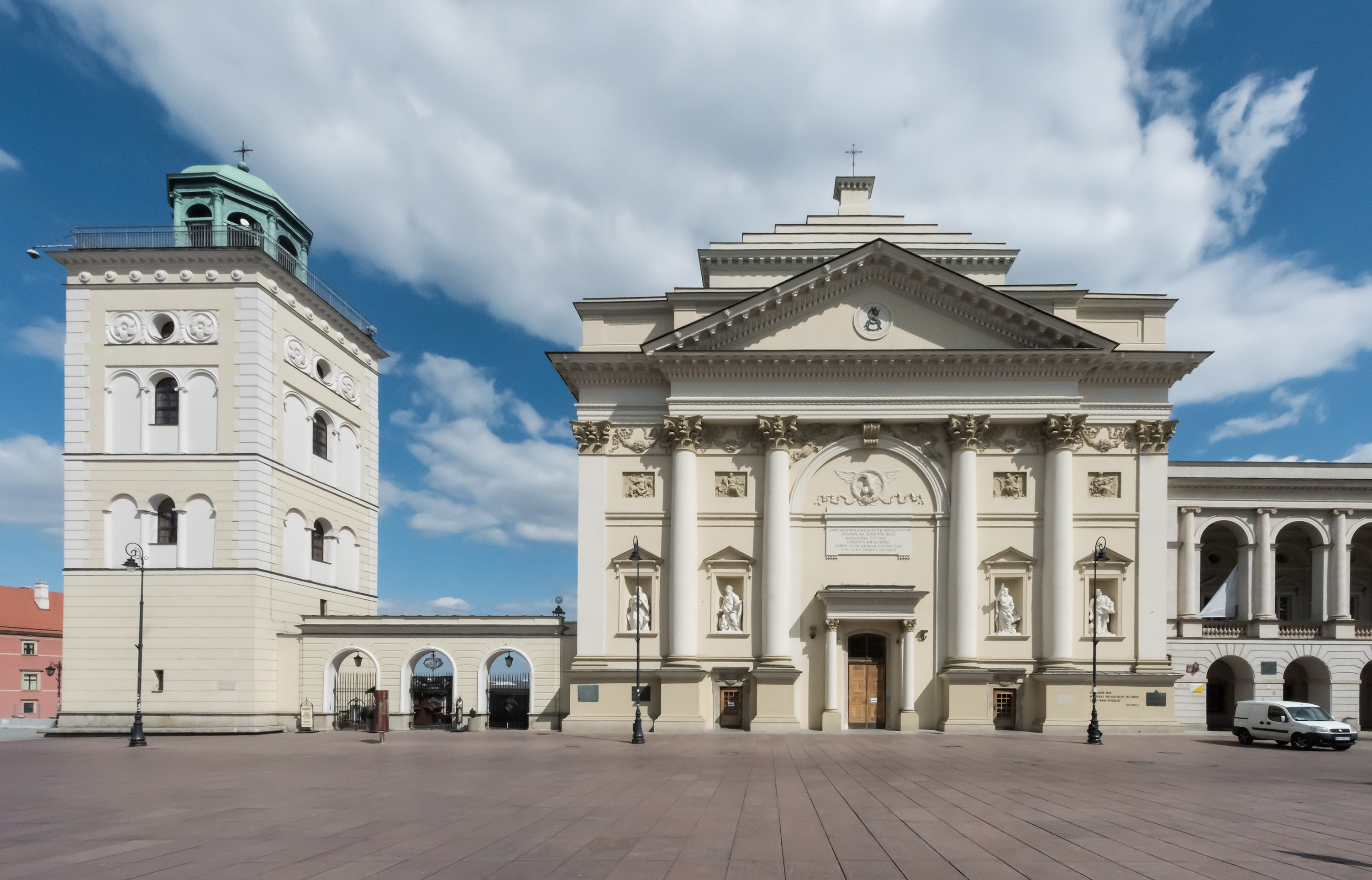
Catholic St. Anne's Church in Warsaw

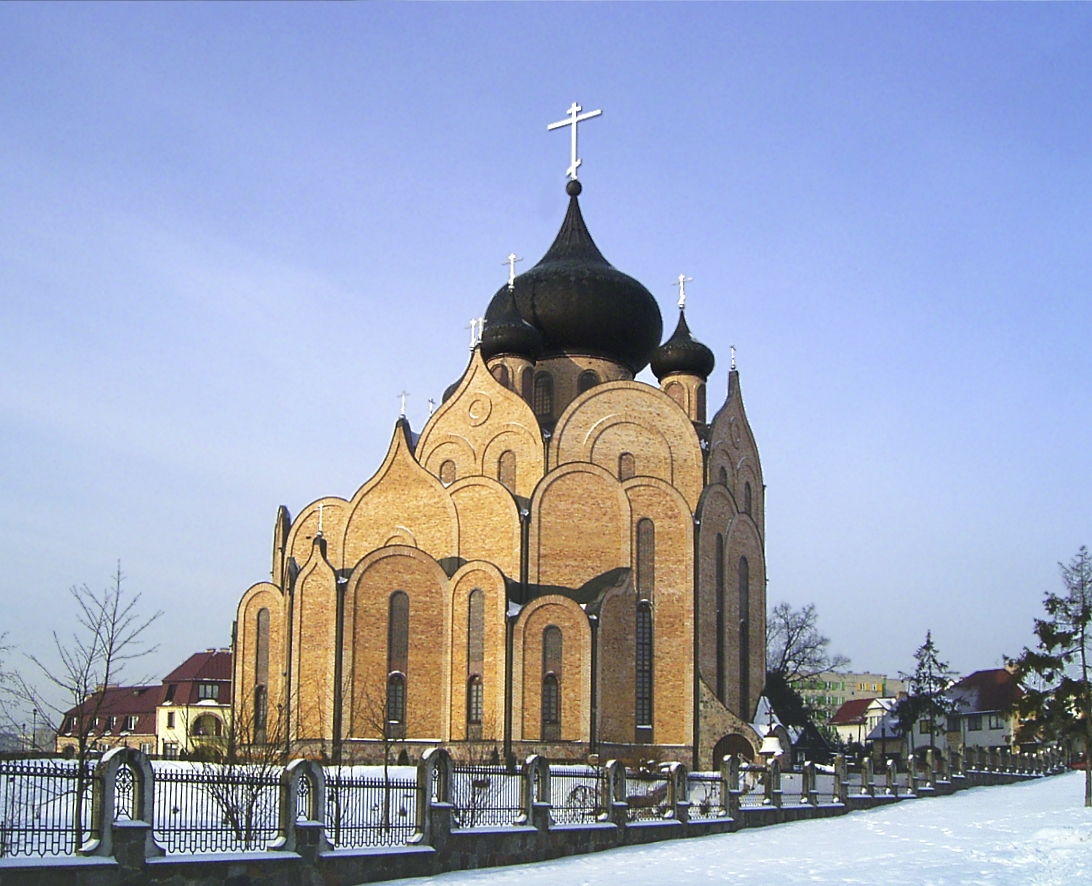
Eastern Orthodox Church of the Holy Spirit in Białystok

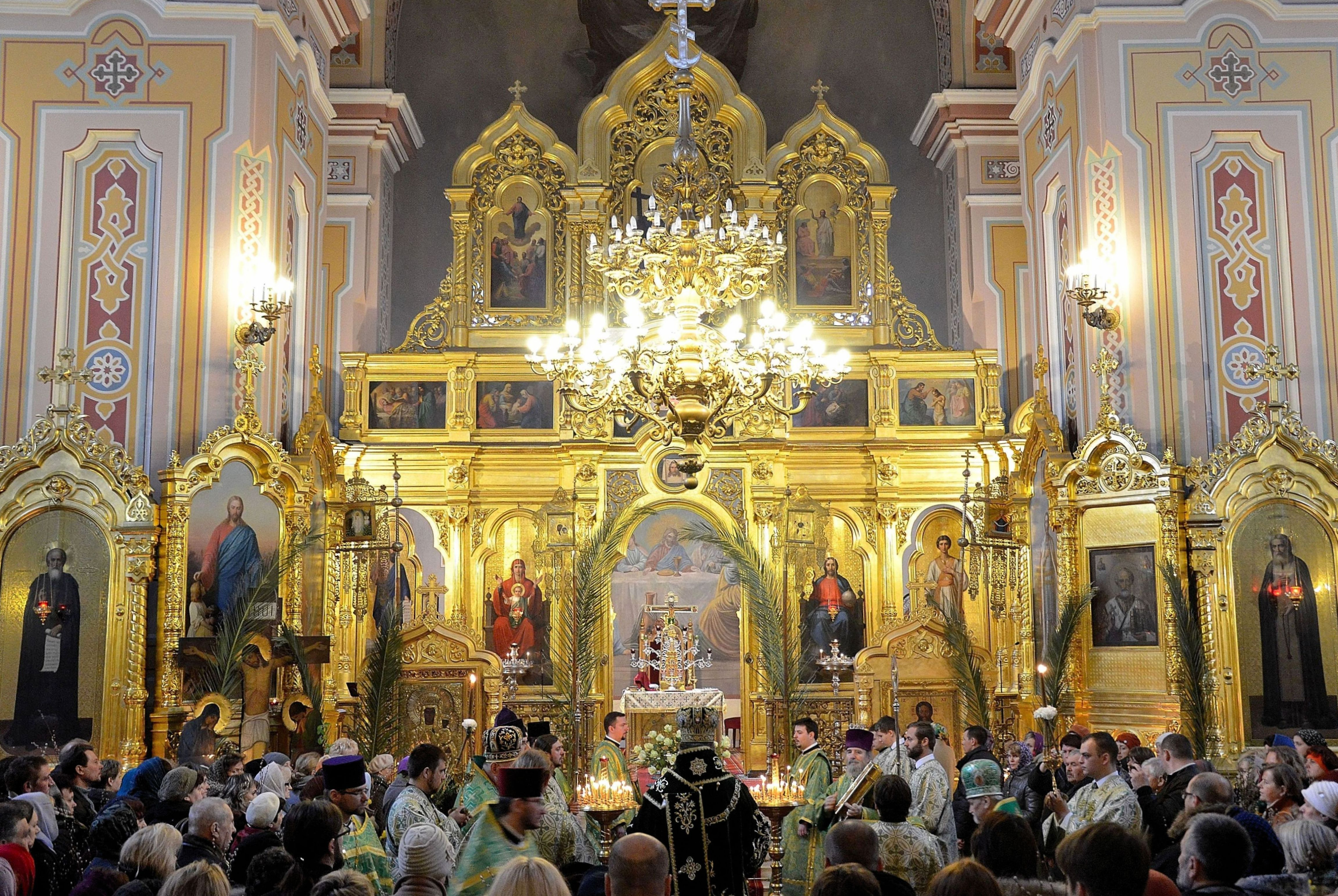
Eastern Orthodox Metropolitan Cathedral in Warsaw

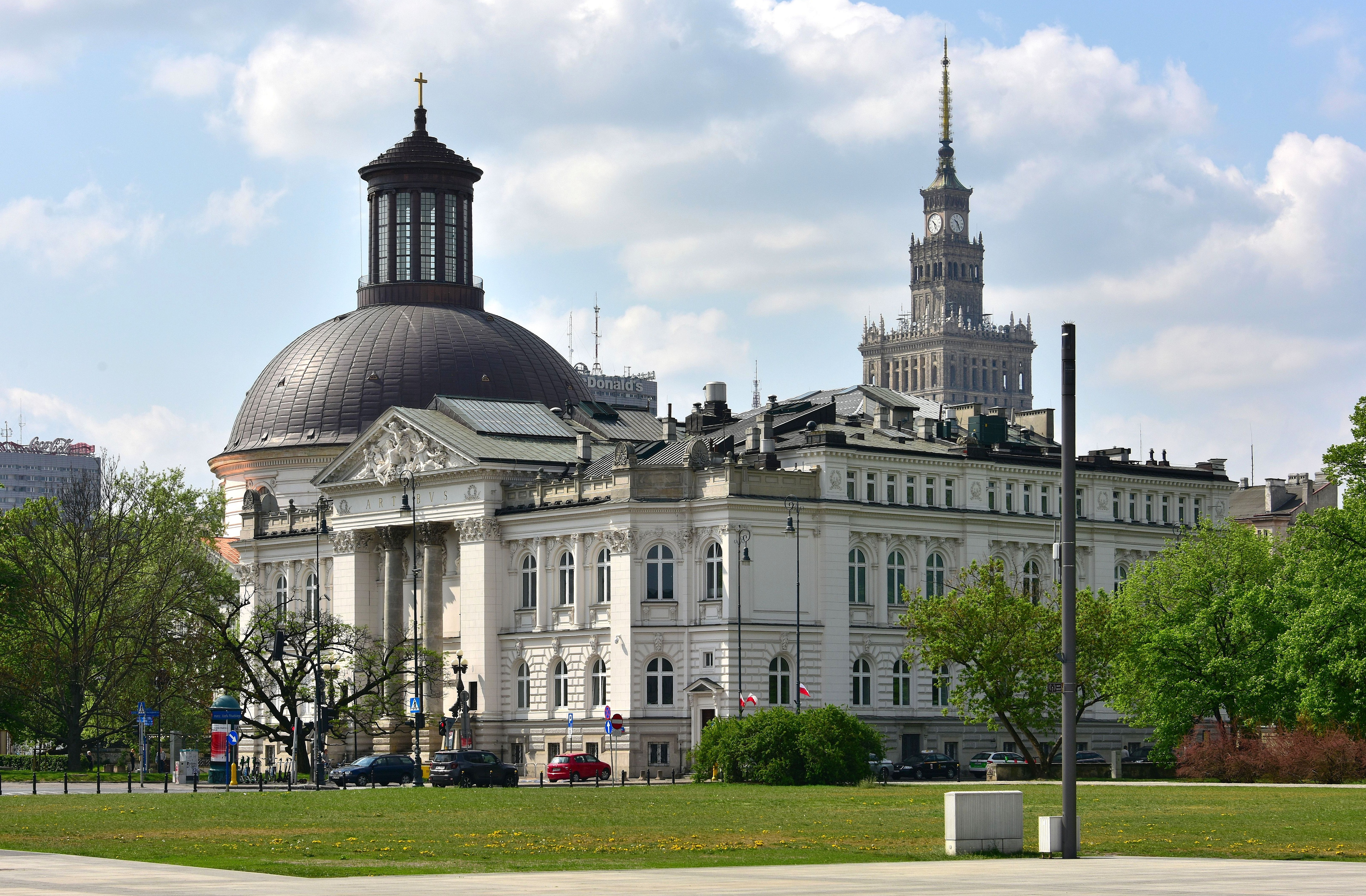
Lutheran Holy Trinity Church in Warsaw

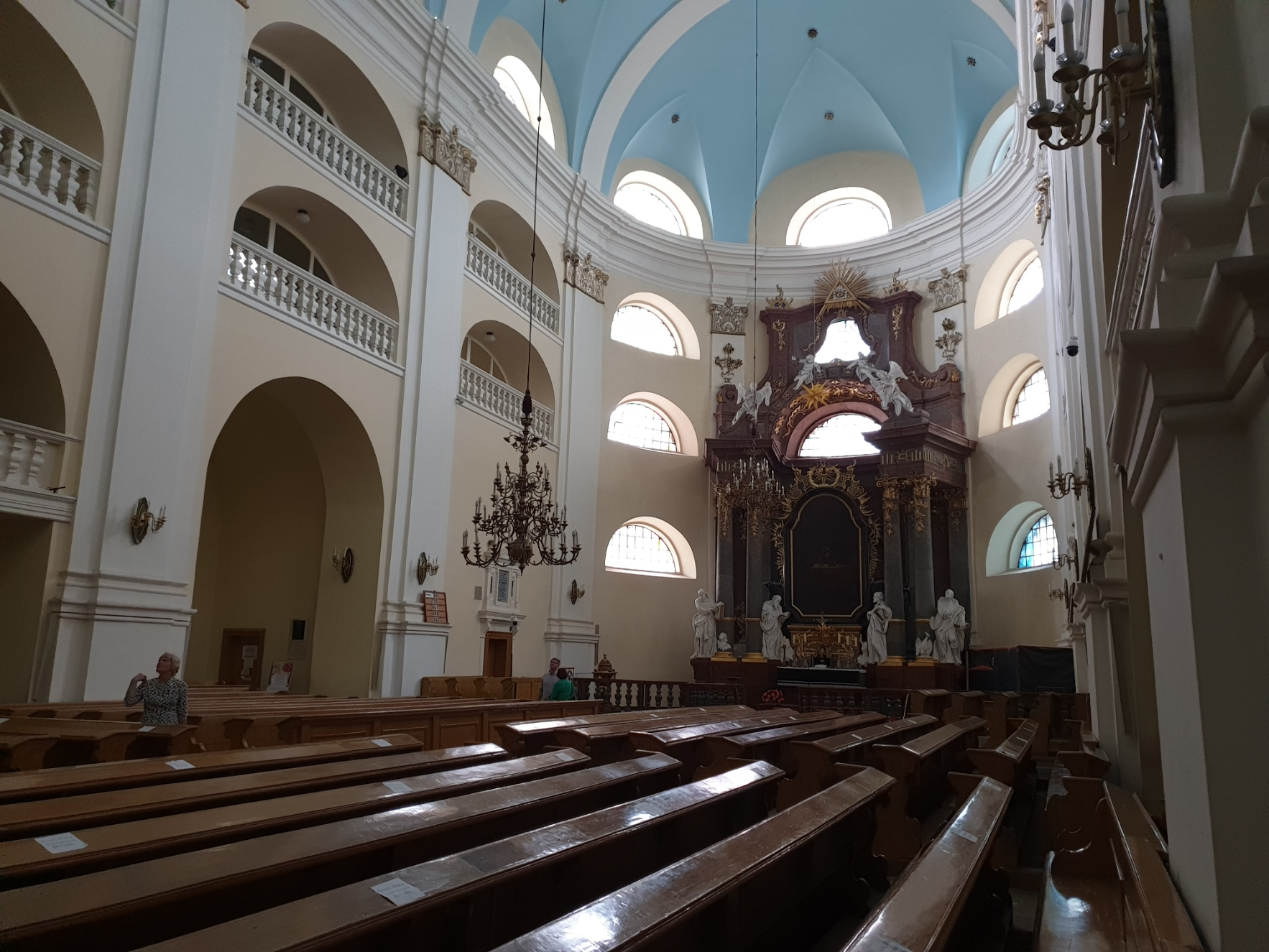
Lutheran Jesus Church in Cieszyn

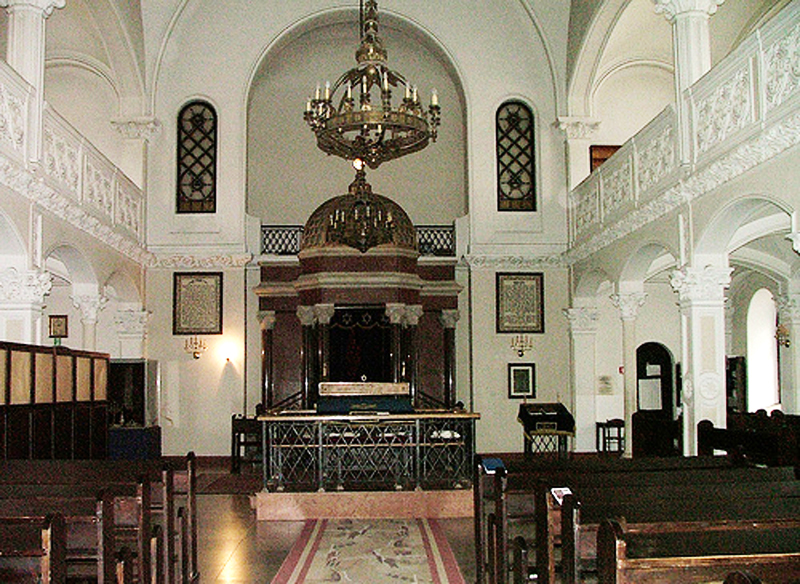
Nożyk Synagogue in Warsaw

White Stork Synagogue in Wrocław

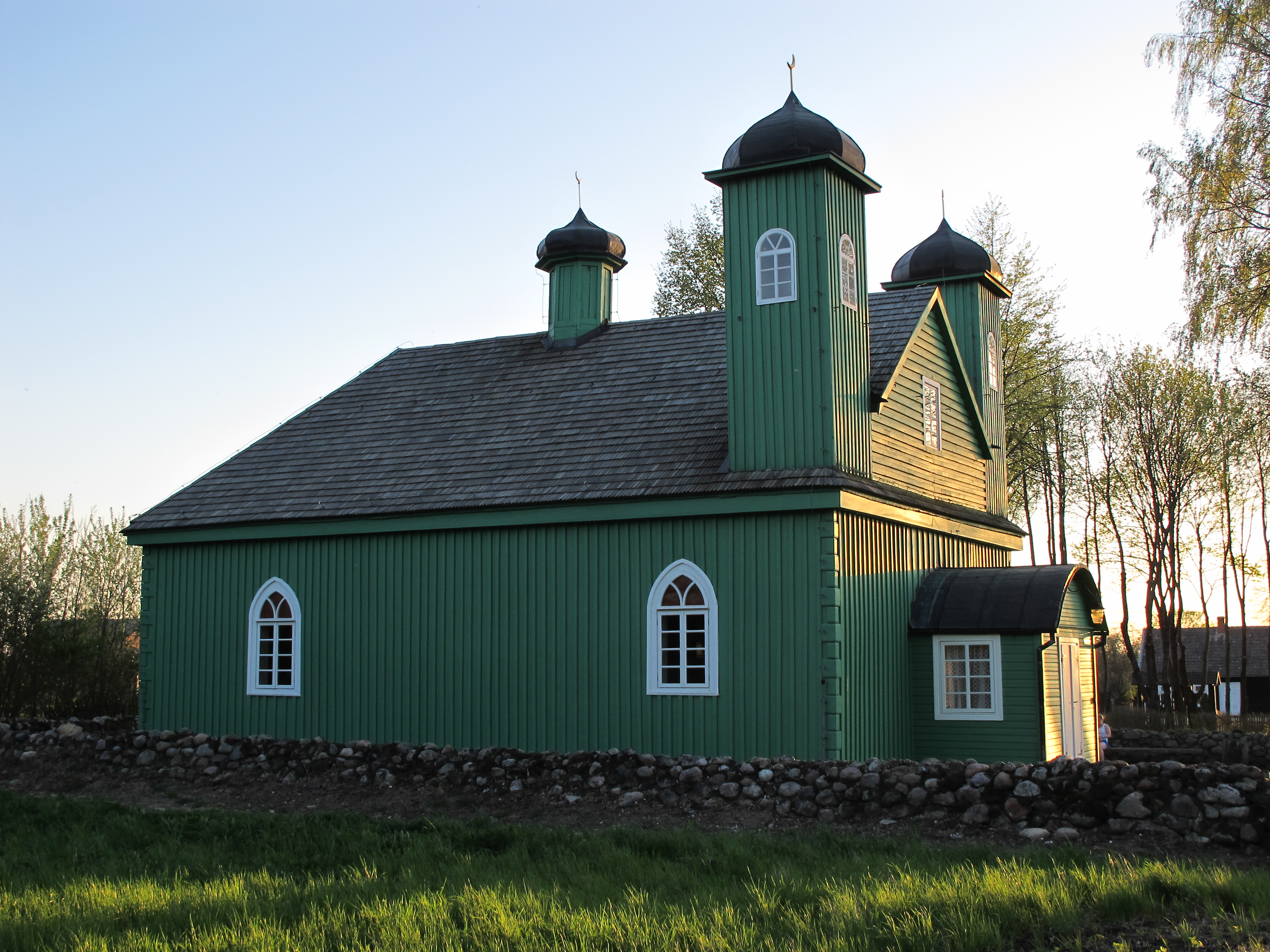
Mosque in Kruszyniany

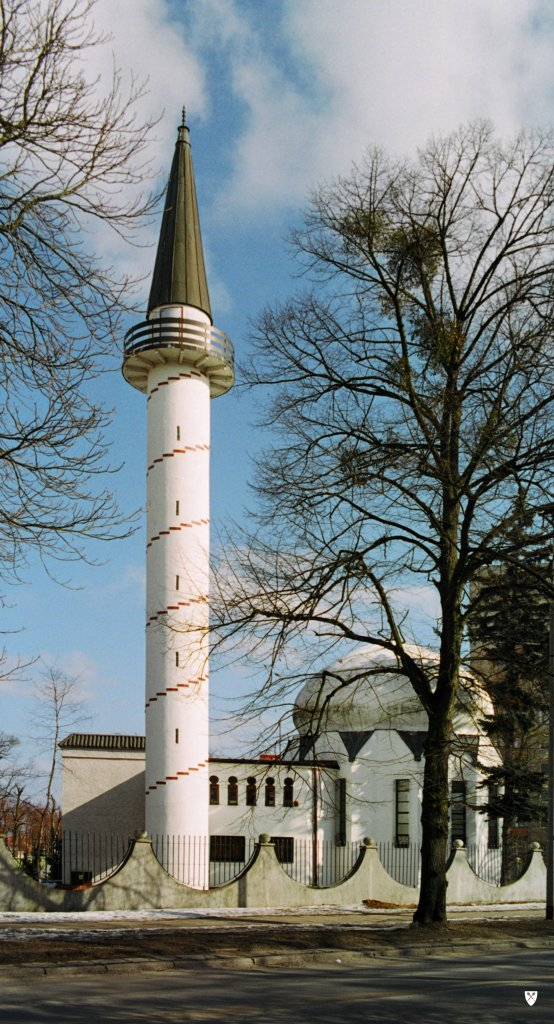
Mosque in Gdańsk

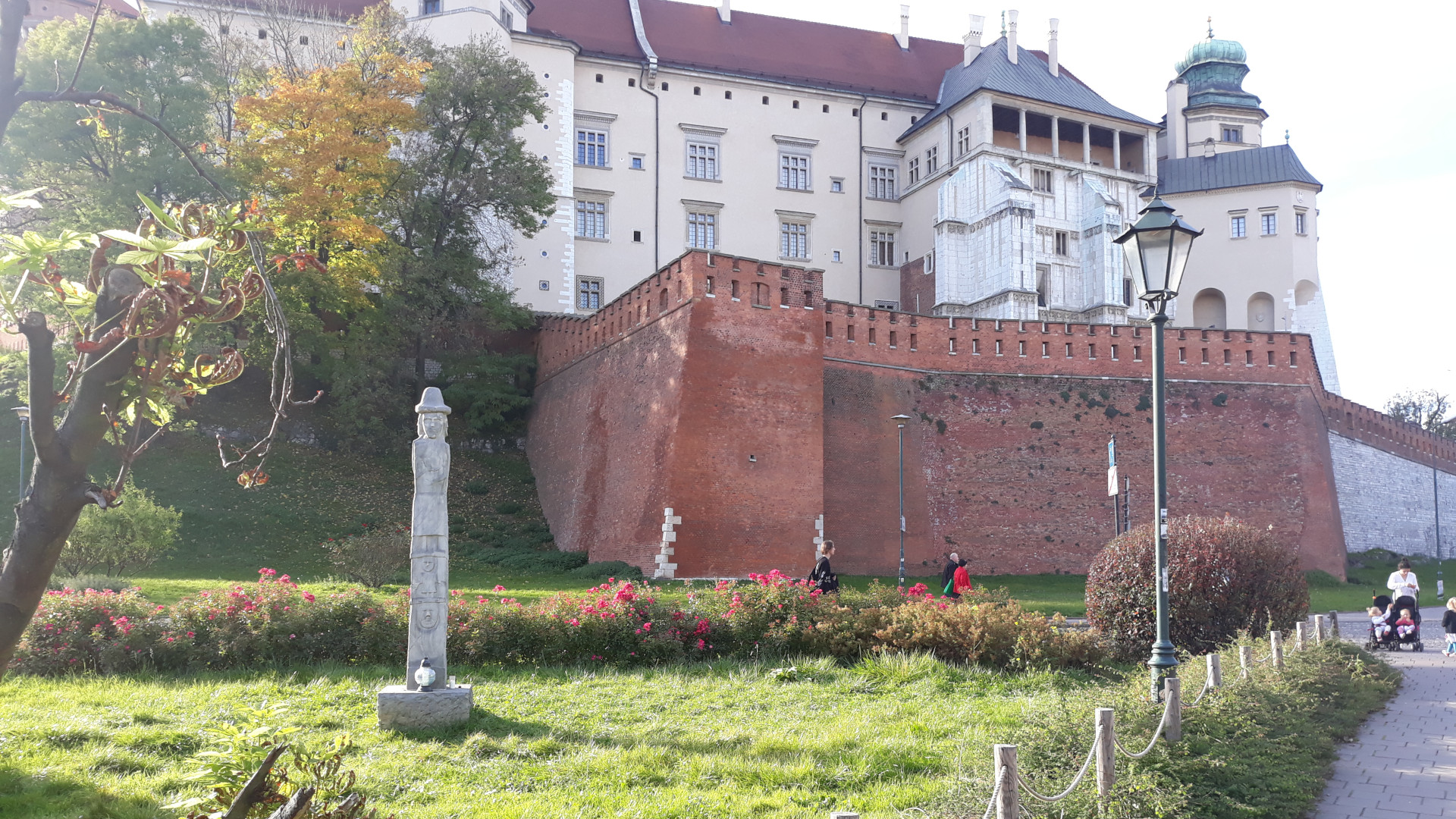
Światowid monument by Wawel in Kraków

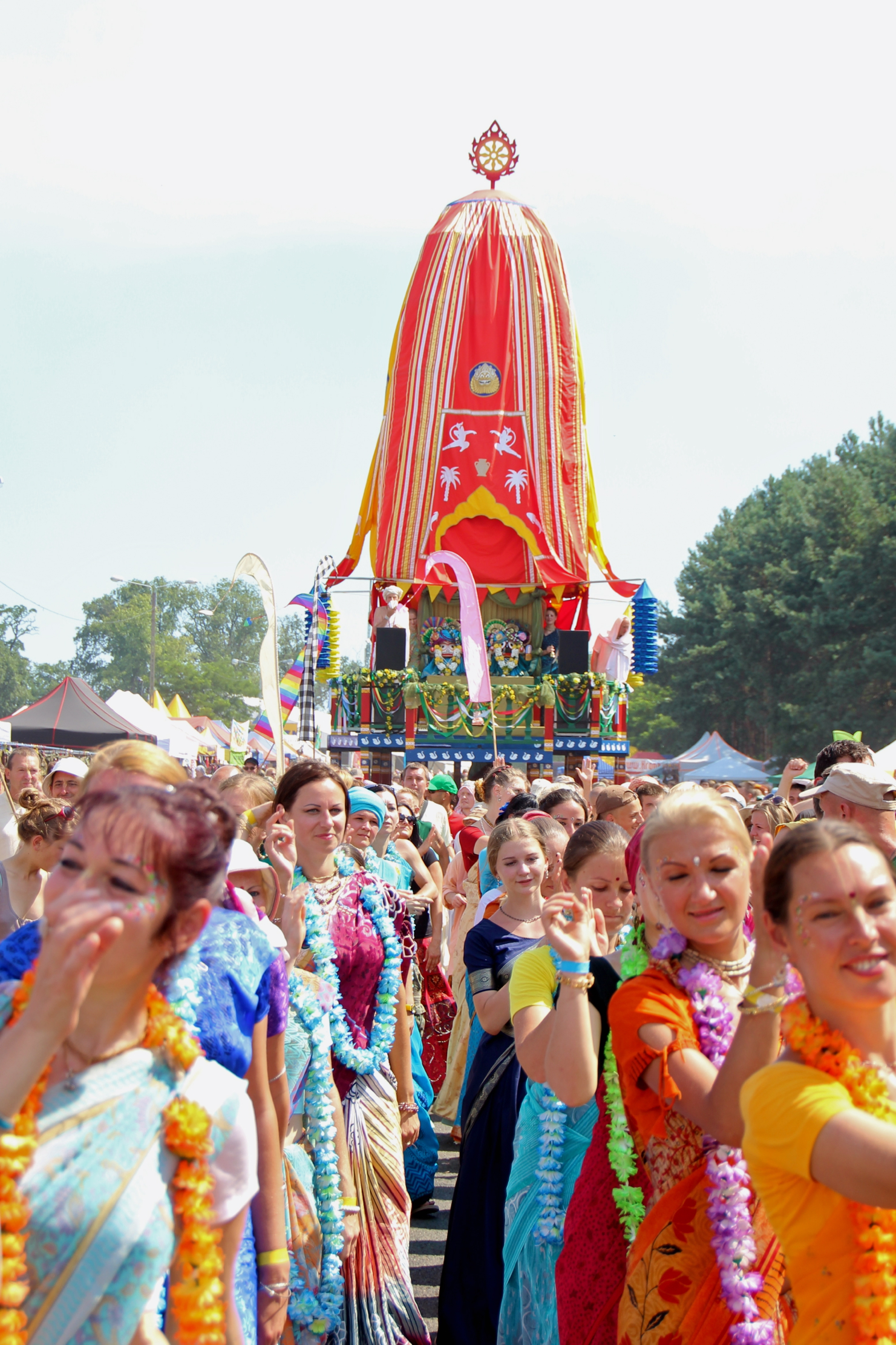
International Society for Krishna Consciousness at Pol'and'Rock Festival

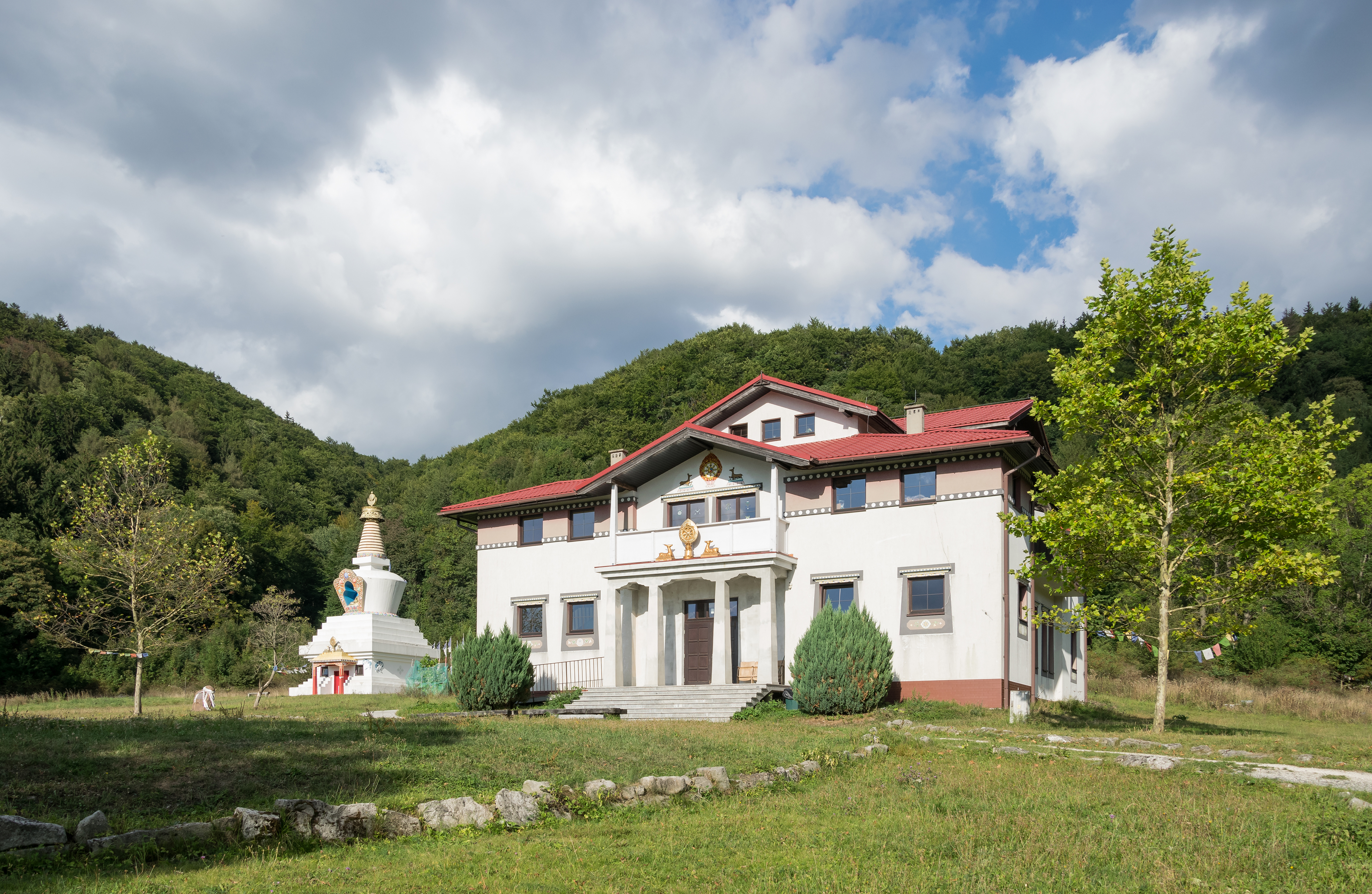
Gompa Drophan Ling in Darnków

== See also ==
- The Most Holy Virgin Mary, Queen of Poland
- Catholic Church in Poland
- Eastern Orthodoxy in Poland
- Protestantism in Poland
- Islam in Poland
- Buddhism in Poland
- Hinduism in Poland
- History of the Jews in Poland
- Bahá'í Faith in Poland
- Polish anti-religious campaign (1945–1990)
- Enthronement movement
- Irreligion in Poland
