= Kuchary, Masovian Voivodeship =

Kuchary
- Village
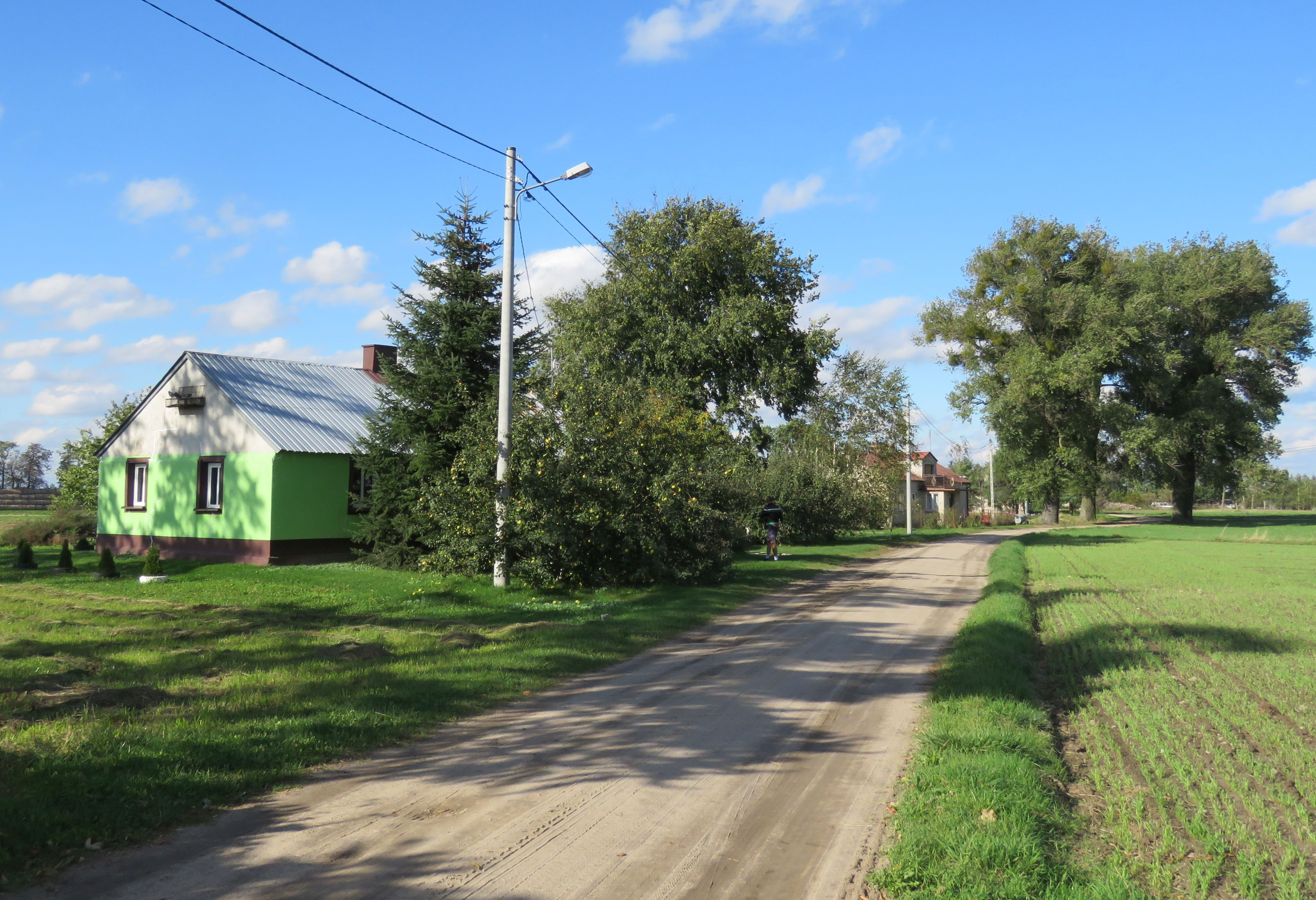

- Location within Poland
- Coordinates: 52°46′N 19°59′E
- Country: Poland
- Voivodeship: Masovian
- County: Płock
- Gmina: Drobin
- Population: 210
- Time zone: UTC+1 (CET)
  - Summer (DST): UTC+2 (CEST)
- Vehicle registration: WPL

Kuchary [kuˈxarɨ] is a village in the administrative district of Gmina Drobin, within Płock County, Masovian Voivodeship, in central Poland.

The Buddhist Gompa Karma Kagyu is located in Kuchary.
