= Baháʼí Faith in Poland =

The history of the Baháʼí Faith in Poland begins in the 1870s when Polish writer Walerian Jablonowski wrote several articles covering the religion's early history in Persia. There was a Polish-language translation of Paris Talks published in 1915. After becoming a Baháʼí in 1925, Poland's Lidia Zamenhof returned to Poland in 1938 as its first well-known Baháʼí. During the period of the Warsaw Pact, Poland adopted the Soviet policy of oppression of religion, so Poland's Baháʼí community, strictly adhering to its principle of obedience to legal government, abandoned its administration and properties. An analysis of publications before and during this period found that coverage by Soviet-based sources was basically hostile to the Baháʼí Faith while native Polish coverage was neutral or positive. By 1963, only Warsaw was recognized as having a Baháʼí community. Following the fall of communism in Poland because of the Revolutions of 1989, the Baháʼís in Poland began to initiate contact with each other and have meetings; the first of these arose in Kraków and Warsaw. In March 1991, the first Baháʼí Local Spiritual Assembly was re-elected in Warsaw. Poland's National Spiritual Assembly was elected in 1992. According to Baháʼí sources there were about 300 Baháʼís in Poland in 2006 and there have been several articles in Polish publications in 2008 covering the persecution of Baháʼís in Iran and Egypt. The Association of Religion Data Archives (relying on World Christian Encyclopedia) estimated that there were about 300 Baháʼís in 2005.

== Early period ==
The earliest known articles in Polish were written by Aleksander Walerian Jabłonowski in the 1870s after he had met the Baháʼís in Baghdad, and one of these was to defend the Baháʼí Faith against an erroneous article in another publication. Isabella Grinevskaya was the pen name of a very early Russian Baháʼí born in Grodno, and her father is buried in Warsaw. Grodno was sometimes part of Poland and Belarus but during her entire lifetime was part of Russia. She is well known because of a play of hers performed in 1903 called Báb. In the 1910s some Jews in a regiment from Poland while stationed in Turkmenistan came into contact with the Baháʼís there. Later the rector of the Catholic University of Lublin met ʻAbdu'l-Bahá in 1914 while he lived in Palestine, and in 1915 a Polish translation of Paris Talks was published in Silesia.

=== Lidia Zamenhof ===
Around 1925, Zamenhof became a member of the Baháʼí Faith. Zamenhof was the official representative of the religion to the dedication of the monument erected upon the grave of her father in Warsaw in 1926. Some Canadian Baháʼís visited Poland in the early 1930s while Zamenhof went to the United States in late 1937 to teach the religion as well as Esperanto. In December 1938 she returned to Poland, where she continued to teach and translated Baháʼu'lláh and the New Era (see John Esslemont), The Hidden Words and Some Answered Questions. While Zamenhof worked on the translations publication was delayed and accomplished out of France by a Polish nephew of Anne Lynch then in a Swiss internment camp for Polish officers. In the second half of 1938 Zamenhof was a major influence of the conversion of the first known Ukrainian becoming a Baháʼí, who was living in eastern Poland at the time. Zamenhof mentions there were five Baháʼís in Poland in August 1939. Contact was made in 1947 with nine individuals investigating the religion mostly through Esperantist writings. One of them offered Zamenhof a hiding place she had declined. She was arrested and eventually killed at the Treblinka extermination camp in the autumn of 1942.

=== Period of oppression ===
Since its inception, the religion has had involvement in socio-economic development beginning by giving greater freedom to women, promulgating the promotion of female education as a priority concern, and that involvement was given practical expression by creating schools, agricultural coops, and clinics. The religion entered a new phase of activity when a message of the Universal House of Justice dated 20 October 1983 was released. Baháʼís were urged to seek out ways, compatible with the Baháʼí teachings, in which they could become involved in the social and economic development of the communities in which they lived. Worldwide in 1979 there were 129 officially recognized Baháʼí socioeconomic development projects. By 1987, the number of officially recognized development projects had increased to 1,482. However, in the Soviet sphere during the period of the Warsaw Pact, Poland adopted the Soviet policy of oppression of religion, so the Baháʼís, strictly adhering to their principle of obedience to legal government, abandoned its administration and properties. From 1947 to 1950, Baháʼís were still known to be in seven cities in Poland. In 1948 there was a known group studying the religion in Warsaw. While the Baháʼís in Poland were retreating from public view, in Chicago, which is home to the largest ethnically Polish population outside of Warsaw, saw the rise of the first Baháʼí House of Worship in the West, which was completed in 1953. In 1960, a Baháʼí traveled from Poland to Luxembourg for a Baháʼí meeting. By 1963 only Warsaw was recognized as having an active community. After that, until about 1989, the Soviet oppression of religions ended public activities of the religion. See also other Soviet bloc countries which had Baháʼí communities like Ukraine, Turkmenistan among others. While the Baháʼí community became all but unknown, the religion had been the object of some academic and popular commentary in Poland over the years. There are several distinctions between Soviet coverage translated into Polish and native Polish coverage of the Baháʼí Faith. There were differences in sources cited, periods when the works were published, and attitudes about the religion presented. Most Soviet translations cited works from Persian antagonists of the religion. The native Polish works cited leaders of the religion or western or earlier Polish academics. For the native Polish works no Russian or Soviet publications, either in translation or in original, were cited. The translations from Soviet academics largely came from the later period during Soviet domination of Poland while most of the native Polish references were from the period before. The Soviet sources tried to portray the history of the religion as supporting the philosophy of Dialectical materialism of Soviet communism as an early anti-feudal movement but in the end supporting imperialism and colonialism. Contrary to this, native Polish works were either neutral or sympathetic to the religion, including publications from the Catholic Church in Poland. One of the few Polish Baháʼís known from this period was Ola Pawlowska, a native of Poland who had fled during World War II and settled in Canada, where she became a member of the religion. In 1953 she became a Knight of Baháʼu'lláh when she moved to St. Pierre and Miquelon Islands. In 1969 she was traveling in the Democratic Republic of the Congo. In 1971 at the age 61 she returned to Poland for a period of almost 2 years before pioneering to Luxemburg and then Zaire where she took interest in the Pygmy population. Lisa Janti, better known as Lisa Montell, a Hollywood actress of the 1950s and 60s, was born Irena Augustynowic and her family fled Poland before World War II. In the 1960s she joined the religion and then worked on several advocacy projects while continuing to work in the arts. Contact at the time was so minimal that it is worth noting Polish visitors to Baháʼí Houses of Worship: before 1973 some visited the temple in Panama who were surprised to meet a guide who could speak a little Polish and in May 1978 a dance troupe from Poland visited the one near Chicago. In 1979 a Polish citizen attending an Esperantist convention joined the religion.

== Re-development ==
Following political changes in Poland following the Solidarity movement, the Baháʼís in Poland began to initiate contact and have meetings, with the first of these arising in Kraków and Warsaw. By 1990, the Baháʼís from the West were helping to build a center to serve as a place to host a Baháʼí summer school near Olesnica. In March 1991 the first Local Spiritual Assembly was re-elected in Warsaw. The next assemblies in 1991-2 were in Białystok, Gdańsk, Kraków, Katowice, Lublin, Łódź, Poznań, Szczecin, and Wrocław. The National Assembly was elected in 1992 (indeed Pawlowska moved back to Poland at the age of 82 for a short time to help form the assembly). Jane (Sadler) Helbo was among those to pioneer to Poland when she moved to Olsztyn from 1992 to 2000. In the spring of 1992 the Polish Baháʼí community participated in the election of the Universal House of Justice, and in December 1993 Polish Ambassador to Israel Dr. Jan Dowgiatto paid an official visit to the headquarters of the religion in Haifa, Israel. Through the 1990s, Baháʼís in Poland presented at or were invited to various conferences or university classes. In 1999, Baháʼí composer Lasse Thoresen of Norway had a composition performed at the Warsaw Autumn. In 2004 Senator Maria Szyszkowska held hearings at which Baháʼís gave presentations.

== Modern community ==
In 2000, Poland supported a United Nations human rights resolution about concern over the Baháʼís in Iran as well as taking steps to further document conditions. There were about three hundred Baháʼís in Poland in 2006. The 2006 and 2008 Polish summer schools took place late July in Serock, near Warsaw. Several Polish language publications have covered the religion in recent years. The Polish edition of Cosmopolitan had an extended article about the Baháʼí Faith in August 2008 by Małgorzata Łuka-Kowalczyk who followed a family learning about the religion. The Polish Gazette (Gazeta Wyborcza) also covered the religion in February and April 2008, mostly covering the Persecution of Baháʼís in Iran (and once earlier in October 2006 covering the situation in Egypt). Baháʼís from Poland were among the more than 4,600 people who gathered in Frankfurt for the largest ever Baháʼí conference in Germany. The Association of Religion Data Archives (relying on World Christian Encyclopedia) estimated about 990 Baháʼís in 2005. According to the official Polish Baháʼí website, there are about 300 Baháʼís in Poland.

== See also ==
- History of Poland
- Religion in Poland
