= Stanislaw Schayer =

Polish Indologist, linguist and philosopher (1899–1941)

- Born: May 8, 1899
- Died: December 1, 1941
- Occupation: Professor

Stanislaw Schayer (May 8, 1899, in Sędziszów, Poland – December 1, 1941, in Otwock, Poland) was a linguist, Indologist, philosopher, professor at the University of Warsaw. In 1922, he founded, and was the first director, of the Institute of Oriental Studies at the University of Warsaw. He was a member of the Polish Academy of Arts and Sciences and the Warsaw Scientific Society.

== Bibliography ==
- Glashoff, Klaus (2004). "Stanisław Schayer's Method of Research on Nyāya". Journal of Indian Philosophy. 32: 295–319. doi:10.1023/B:INDI.0000044317.94739.88. S2CID 160022413.
- Wilowski, Włodzimierz (1988). Stanisław Schayer, twórca polskiej szkoły studiów nad filozofią indyjską. Vol. 105. Wydział Filologiczno-Filozoficzny. pp. 62–68.
