= Gompa Drophan Ling in Darnków =

Buddhist centre of Bhutanese and Tibetan traditions in Poland

Gompa Drophan Ling (in dzongkha: Benefit for everyone) of the Polish Buddhist Khordong Association in Darnków in the Table Mountains, is the Buddhist centre of Bhutanese and Tibetan traditions in Poland. This gompa built and decorated according to traditional Bhutanese patterns, is the only building of that kind in Poland, and one of few such buildings in Europe.

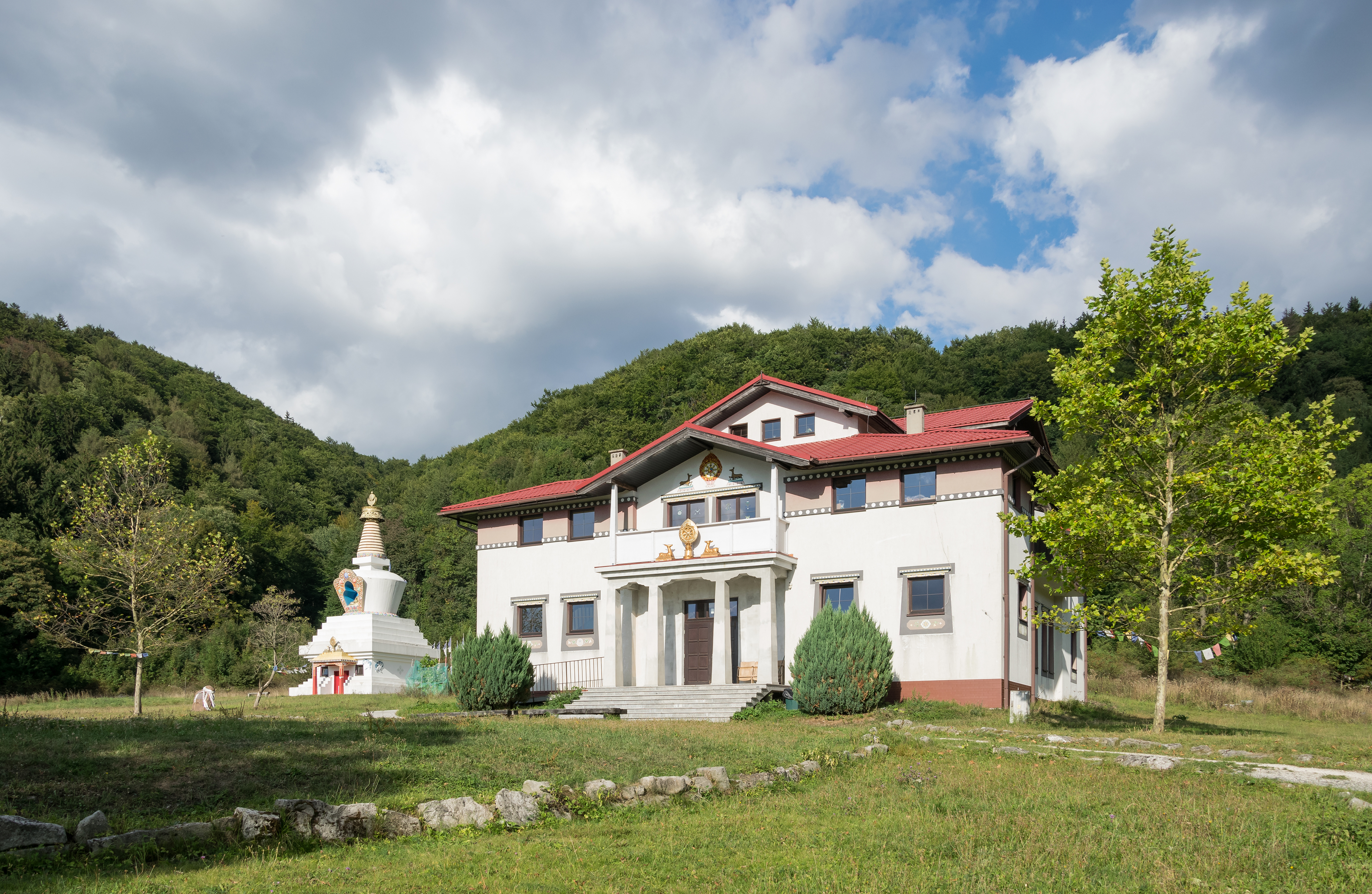
Gompa's main building in Darnków

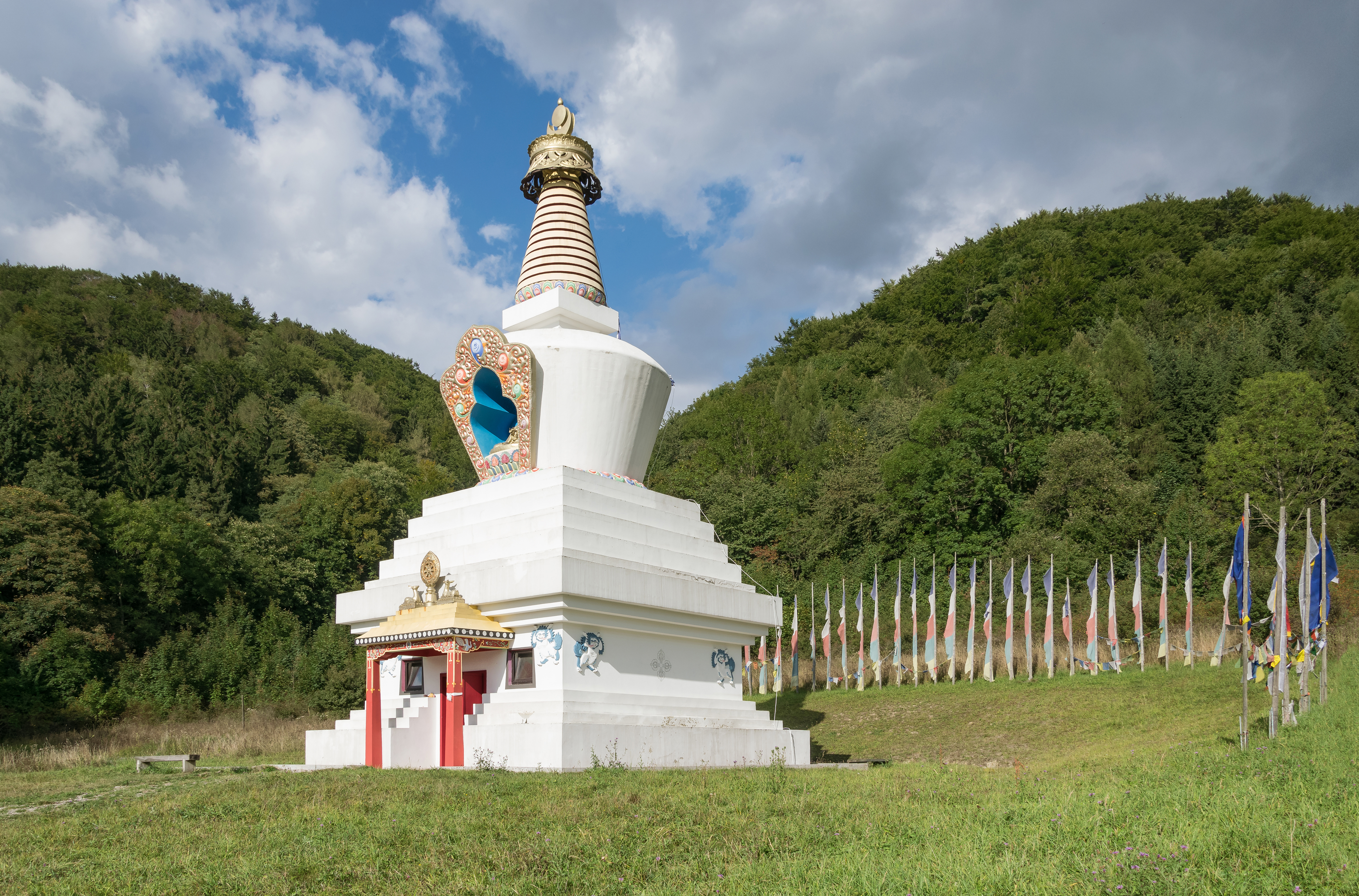
Stupa

== History ==
In 1995 two members of the sangha donated the 7 hectares estate in Darnków to Chimé Rigdzin Rinpoche. Rinpoche handed the estate over to the Polish Buddhist Khordong Association with recommendation to establish the Buddhist temple and the centre of seclusions there, thus creating the place where the Dziangter and Khordong tradition would develop.

Because of insufficient funds the gompa came into existence gradually, and religious ceremonies at first were held in a local holiday resort. Since 1997 in Darnków a tradition of annual offering of 111,111 butter lamps has been initiated in intention for world peace. In July 1999 a cornerstone celebration was held in Darnków on the future gompas' place.

Only in April 2001 the gompa's construction begun in the traditional Bhutanese style. In 2007 the main meditation hall was decorated with traditional Buddhist paintings executed by painters from Bhutan.

In gompa there are, besides rooms for religious worship, important other infrastructures: sanitary complex, dormitory, camp site, additional stone house, and the dining room.

Up till today the gompa has been visited by over 300 people from entire Europe who came in order to practise meditation together with Master Rinpoche. In the gompa regular courses have been held with teachers of the Tibetan Buddhism as part of the group or individual practice. The Drophan Ling gompa preserves and publishes Buddhist texts, and cultivates Tibetan traditions according to Padmasambhava's teachings and Khordong traditions.
