= Demographics of Poland =

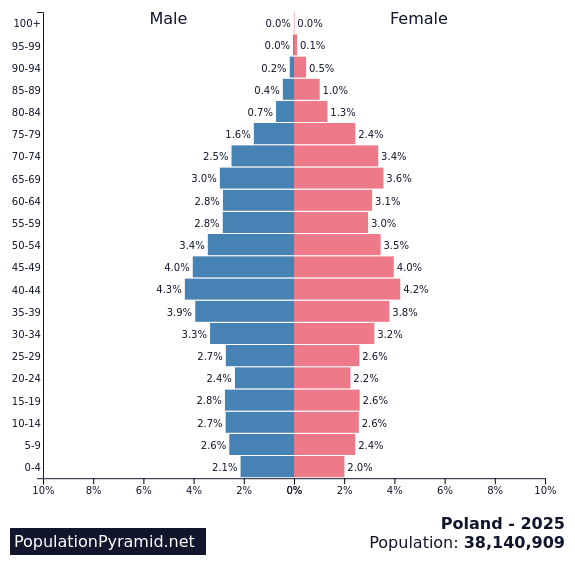
- Population pyramid of Poland in 2025 based on United Nations World Population Prospects data.
- Population: ▼37,489,000
  - Year: 31 December 2024
- Density: 119/km^{2}
- Growth rate: -0.42%
- Birth rate: 6.7 births/1,000 population
- Death rate: 10.9 deaths/1,000 population
- Life expectancy: 78.76 years
  - male: 75.02 years
  - female: 82.73 years
- Fertility rate: 1.10 children per woman
- Infant mortality: 3.6 deaths/1,000 live births
- Net migration rate: 0.2 migrant(s)/1,000 population
- Immigrant share: 4.5% (2024)

Age structure
- 0–14 years: 14.6%
- 15–64 years: 64.7%
- 65 and over: 20.6%

Sex ratio
- Total: 107 females per 100 male

Nationality
- Nationality: Polish, Pole
- Major ethnic: ▲: Poles (98.59%); Silesians (0.62%); Kashubians (0.04%); Lemkos (0.02%); Lithuanians (0.02%); Romanis (0.02%); Ashkenazi Jews (0.02%); Non-autochthonous (0.53%); Ukrainians (0.17%); Belarusians (0.11%); Germans (0.11%); Russians (0.03%); Armenians (0.01%); English (0.01%); Slovaks (0.01%); Czechs (0.01%); Others (0.05%)
- Minor ethnic: ▲ Other groups (0.08%); Viets (0.01%); ▼ Unknown (0.03%)

Language
- Official: Polish
- Spoken: Silesian, German, Kashubian, Rusyn and Yiddish

The demographics of Poland include population density, ethnicity, education level, the health of the populace, economic status, religious affiliations, and other aspects of the population.

As of 31 December 2024, the population of Poland was 37,489,000, while the usually resident population was 36,497,495. The population has exhibited a negative growth rate of −0.42% per year. The population density was 119 people per square kilometer. The proportion of the population residing in urban areas was 59%, a figure that has been declining as a consequence of suburbanization. The sex ratio was 107 women per 100 men, 112 per 100 in urban areas, and 101 per 100 in rural areas. The median age was over 43 years (nearly 42 years for males and 45 years for females).

According to the 2021 census by the Polish Central Statistical Office (GUS), as of March 31, 2021, Poland had an official population of 38,036,118, a decrease of 0.9% since the 2011 census, and a usually resident population of 37,019,327, a 2.7% decrease since the 2011 census. The difference between official and usually resident population comes from two different methodologies used by GUS for population counts. In addition, Poland is home to a large number of foreigners, most of whom are not counted towards the official population of the country. As of the 2021 census, there were 1,433,779 of them in Poland.

Historical population
Year	Pop.	±%
1950	24,613,684	—
1960	29,405,729	+19.5%
1970	32,589,209	+10.8%
1978	35,061,000	+7.6%
1988	37,879,105	+8.0%
2002	38,230,080	+0.9%
2011	38,511,824	+0.7%
2021	38,036,118	−1.2%

Poland's population has been growing quickly after World War II, during which the country lost millions of citizens. Population passed 38 million in the late 1980s and has since then stagnated within the 38.0-38.6 million range until the 2020s where the effects of the COVID-19 pandemic, the baby boom generation starting to die out and a baby bust started to overlap.

In 2018, the average life expectancy was 77.9 years; 74.1 for men and 82 for women. Population distribution is uneven, with densely populated south, moderately populated center and south-east and scarcely populated north.

Ethnically, Poland used to be one of the most multi-ethnic countries in Europe before World War II. It hosted the largest Jewish community in Europe, with Warsaw being the largest concentration of Jews in the world besides New York City. In the eastern parts of the country, Ukrainians and Belarusians often outnumbered Poles, while in the west there were large German communities. After the war, Poland became an ethnically homogeneous country. However, in the last decade Poland witnessed a mass-scale migration to the country, mostly from neighboring Ukraine and Belarus and increasingly from Central, South Asia and the Middle East.

In connection with the Russian invasion of Ukraine on 24 February 2022, as part of the Russo-Ukrainian War, by 2 August 2022, more than 10.4 million Ukrainian refugees left the territory of Ukraine, moving to the countries closest to the west of Ukraine, of which more than 5.1 million people fled to neighboring Poland initially. As of September 2023, 958,120 Ukrainian refugees continue to reside in Poland. They are also not counted towards official or usually resident population.

== History ==
For many centuries, until the end of World War II in 1945, the population of Poland included many significant ethnic minorities.

View source data.
View source data.

View source data.
View source data.

=== 1945–1989 ===
The population of Poland decreased from more than 35 million in 1939 to less than 24 million in 1946. Of that, around 6 million were killed during the Holocaust, Porajmos, and German and Soviet occupations, while the remaining decline can be mostly attributed to altered borders and associated population expulsions of Germans and Ukrainians and resettlement of Poles. As a result, Poland became one of the most ethnically homogeneous areas in Europe.

Poland's population has been rising consistently in the 1945-1989 period, to 37.96 million in 1989. This growth has been fully fueled by positive natural change (more births than deaths), as net international migration was negative for Poland every year between 1966 and 1989, even despite the socialist government's restrictions on leaving the country for any reason. 578,405 people emigrated from Poland between 1966 and 1989, with the main destination countries being Germany (388,137) and United States (50,453).

1.5 million Poles were deported from Eastern Poland by the Soviet Union in 1940-41 to the interior of the country, before Operation Barborossa forced the USSR to declare a general amnesty of Poles in labour camps. 1.5 million were then deported after the war to the Polish People's Republic.

=== 1990–present ===
Since 1990, Poland's population stagnated at 38.0-38.6 million, with the median age rising due to low birth rates. Official population statistics are a point of debate in Poland, though, with many academics criticizing the Polish Central Statistical Office (GUS) for failing to adapt to successfully capture internal and international migration in particular. Already the 2002 census revealed Poland had 402,000 residents less than expected, and subsequent censuses reflected neither the mass emigration of Poles after Poland's admission to the European Union in 2004, nor the mass immigration to Poland since 2014.

== Population ==
Population of Poland 500–2023

=== Structure of the population ===
Population pyramid of Poland from 1950 to 2020

Population Estimates by Sex and Age Group (01.VII.2012) (Data refer to usually resident population.):

Age group	Male	Female	Total	%
Total	18 651 441	19 882 348	38 533 789	100
0–4	1 058 874	1 005 069	2 063 943	5.36
5–9	945 643	897 723	1 843 366	4.78
10–14	974 509	925 506	1 900 015	4.93
15–19	1 158 367	1 108 267	2 266 634	5.88
20–24	1 394 761	1 341 393	2 736 154	7.10
25–29	1 623 072	1 575 546	3 198 618	8.30
30–34	1 602 736	1 558 622	3 161 358	8.20
35–39	1 470 751	1 432 822	2 903 573	7.54
40–44	1 231 083	1 209 751	2 440 834	6.33
45–49	1 196 548	1 192 952	2 389 500	6.20
50–54	1 369 258	1 414 996	2 784 254	7.23
55–59	1 404 141	1 522 140	2 926 281	7.59
60–64	1 163 935	1 350 684	2 514 619	6.53
65–69	675 573	861 584	1 537 157	3.99
70–74	529 739	776 722	1 306 461	3.39
75–79	424 407	720 249	1 144 656	2.97
80–84	278 428	566 126	844 554	2.19
85–89	115 213	311 388	426 601	1.11
90–94	28 565	91 223	119 788	0.31
95–99	4614	18 265	22 879	0.06
100+	224	1320	1544	<0.01
Age group	Male	Female	Total	%
0–14	2 979 026	2 828 298	5 807 324	15.07
15–64	13 615 652	13 707 173	27 322 825	70.91
65+	2 056 763	3 346 877	5 403 640	14.02

Population Estimates by Sex and Age Group (30.VI.2015) (Data refer to usually resident population.):

Age group	Male	Female	Total	%
Total	18 607 417	19 847 159	38 454 576	100
0–4	982 639	928 662	1 911 301	4.97
5–9	1 047 830	996 205	2 044 035	5.32
10–14	924 671	877 780	1 802 451	4.69
15–19	1 028 884	979 585	2 008 469	5.22
20–24	1 257 703	1 209 498	2 467 201	6.42
25–29	1 464 438	1 417 040	2 881 478	7.49
30–34	1 647 147	1 602 930	3 250 077	8.45
35–39	1 561 396	1 522 202	3 083 598	8.02
40–44	1 354 899	1 329 476	2 684 375	6.98
45–49	1 166 358	1 160 878	2 327 236	6.05
50–54	1 211 294	1 238 398	2 449 692	6.37
55–59	1 386 303	1 489 816	2 876 119	7.48
60–64	1 256 035	1 443 985	2 700 020	7.02
65–69	917 893	1 147 725	2 065 618	5.37
70–74	501 311	716 224	1 217 535	3.17
75–79	426 059	715 629	1 141 688	2.97
80–84	287 908	573 415	861 323	2.24
85+	184 649	497 711	682 360	1.77
Age group	Male	Female	Total	%
0–14	2 955 140	2 802 647	5 757 787	14.97
15–64	13 334 457	13 393 808	26 728 265	69.51
65+	2 317 820	3 650 704	5 968 524	15.52

Population Estimates by Sex and Age Group (01.I.2021) (Provisional Estimates):

Age group	Male	Female	Total	%
Total	18 307 488	19 532 513	37 840 001	100
0–4	978 526	926 796	1 905 322	5.04
5–9	979 042	925 737	1 904 779	5.03
10–14	1 049 403	997 556	2 046 959	5.41
15–19	911 890	866 575	1 778 465	4.70
20–24	1 000 405	957 358	1 957 763	5.17
25–29	1 221 584	1 177 960	2 399 544	6.34
30–34	1 420 368	1 367 645	2 788 013	7.37
35–39	1 594 620	1 543 389	3 138 009	8.29
40–44	1 515 234	1 482 301	2 997 535	7.92
45–49	1 328 852	1 316 404	2 645 256	6.99
50–54	1 116 244	1 130 951	2 247 195	5.94
55–59	1 115 823	1 176 530	2 292 353	6.06
60–64	1 246 589	1 407 097	2 653 686	7.01
65–69	1 114 311	1 374 477	2 488 788	6.58
70–74	806 003	1 102 945	1 908 948	5.04
75–79	388 818	621 315	1 010 133	2.67
80–84	291 685	571 202	862 887	2.28
85–89	159 279	376 980	536 259	1.42
90–94	56 278	164 806	221 084	0.58
95–99	10 821	38 970	49 791	0.13
100+	1 713	5 519	7 232	0.02
Age group	Male	Female	Total	%
0–14	3 006 971	2 850 089	5 857 060	15.48
15–64	12 471 609	12 426 210	24 897 819	65.80
65+	2 828 908	4 256 214	7 085 122	18.72

=== Population density and distribution ===
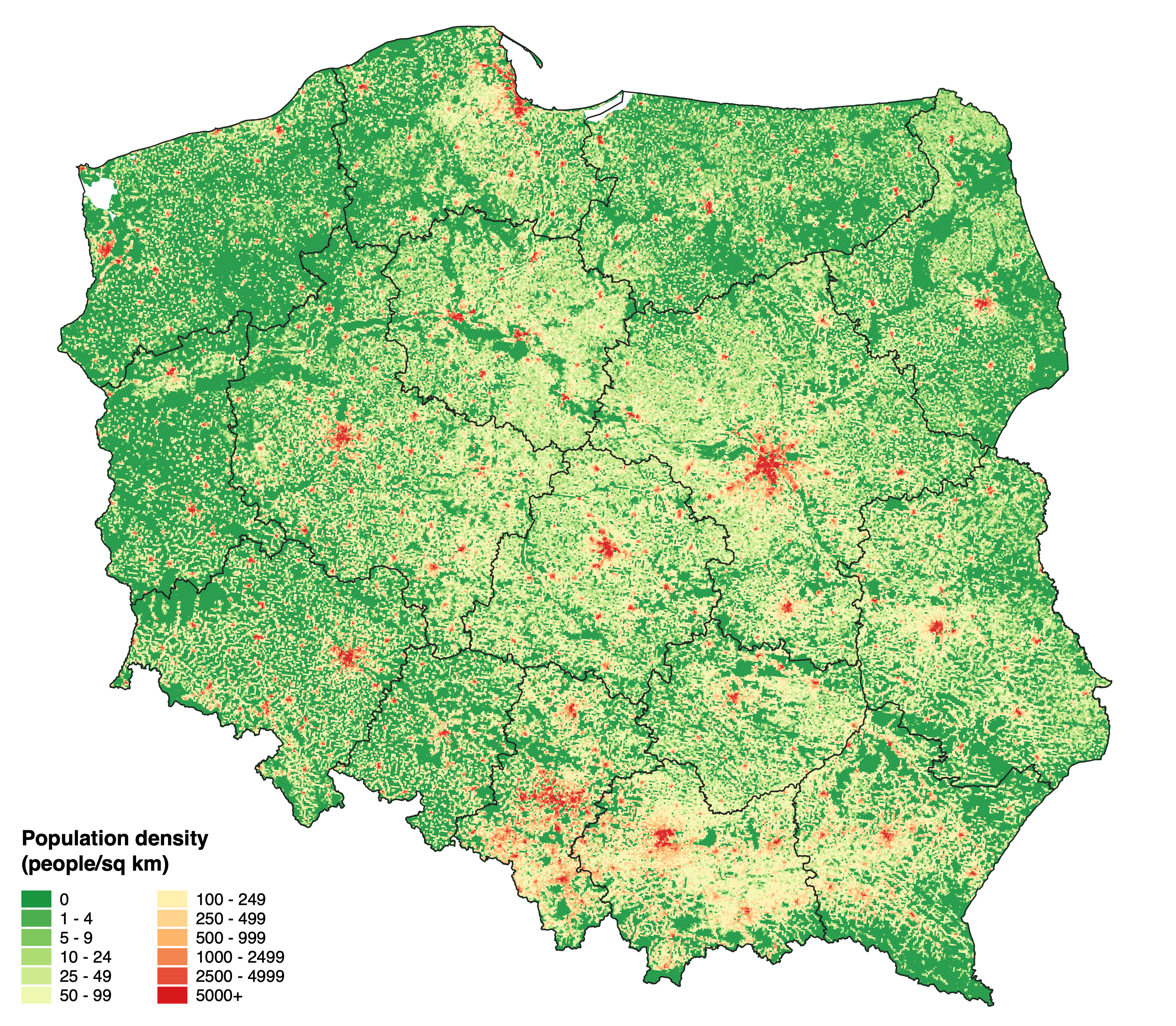
Population density in Poland in a 1x1 km square grid, 2021 census

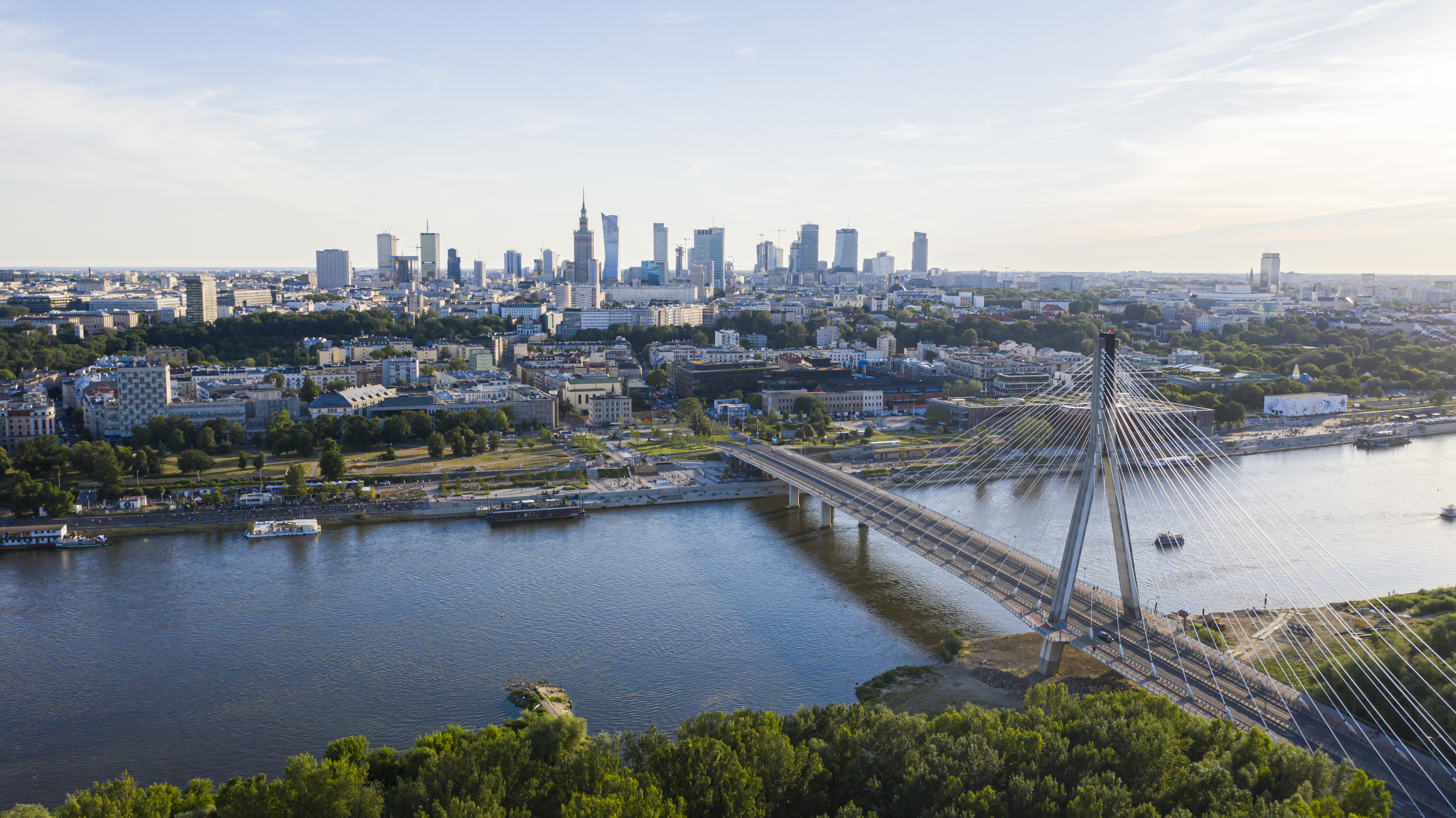
Warsaw is the financial and commercial center of Poland

With an estimated usually resident population of 37 million, Poland is the 5th most-populous country in the European Union and 7th or 8th most-populous one in Europe (depending on how many people live in Ukraine, to which there are various estimates).

Depending on whether one uses the official population or usually resident population as a base, population density of Poland was 122 or 118.7 people per square kilometer (315.9 or 307.4 people per square mile) as of the 2021 census.

Population distribution is unequal. The south, particularly the area along the A4 highway between Gliwice and Rzeszów, is densely populated with over 250 people per square kilometer, while population density drops below 50 people per square kilometer in much of the north of the country. Silesian voivodeship is the densest, at over 350 people per square kilometer.

==== Urban areas ====
Poland is relatively rural for a country of its population and economic development. As of the 2021 census, 59.8% of total population lived in cities and town, a percentage well below European average. Poland has historically been a rural and agricultural country and while cities started rapidly growing in neighboring countries in the second half of the 19th century, many Polish cities were artificially limited in growth by the partitioners due to military reasons. After regaining independence in 1918, Polish authorities have started investment in urbanizing the country but it was quickly interrupted by World War II. Therefore, Poland has not started fully urbanizing until after the war.

Urbanization rate has also been declining, at an annual rate of -0.25% between 2015 and 2020 due to suburbanization. In Poland, many suburbs are officially rural areas despite their resemblance to a town or even a city neighborhood, such as the Poznań suburb of Koziegłowy.

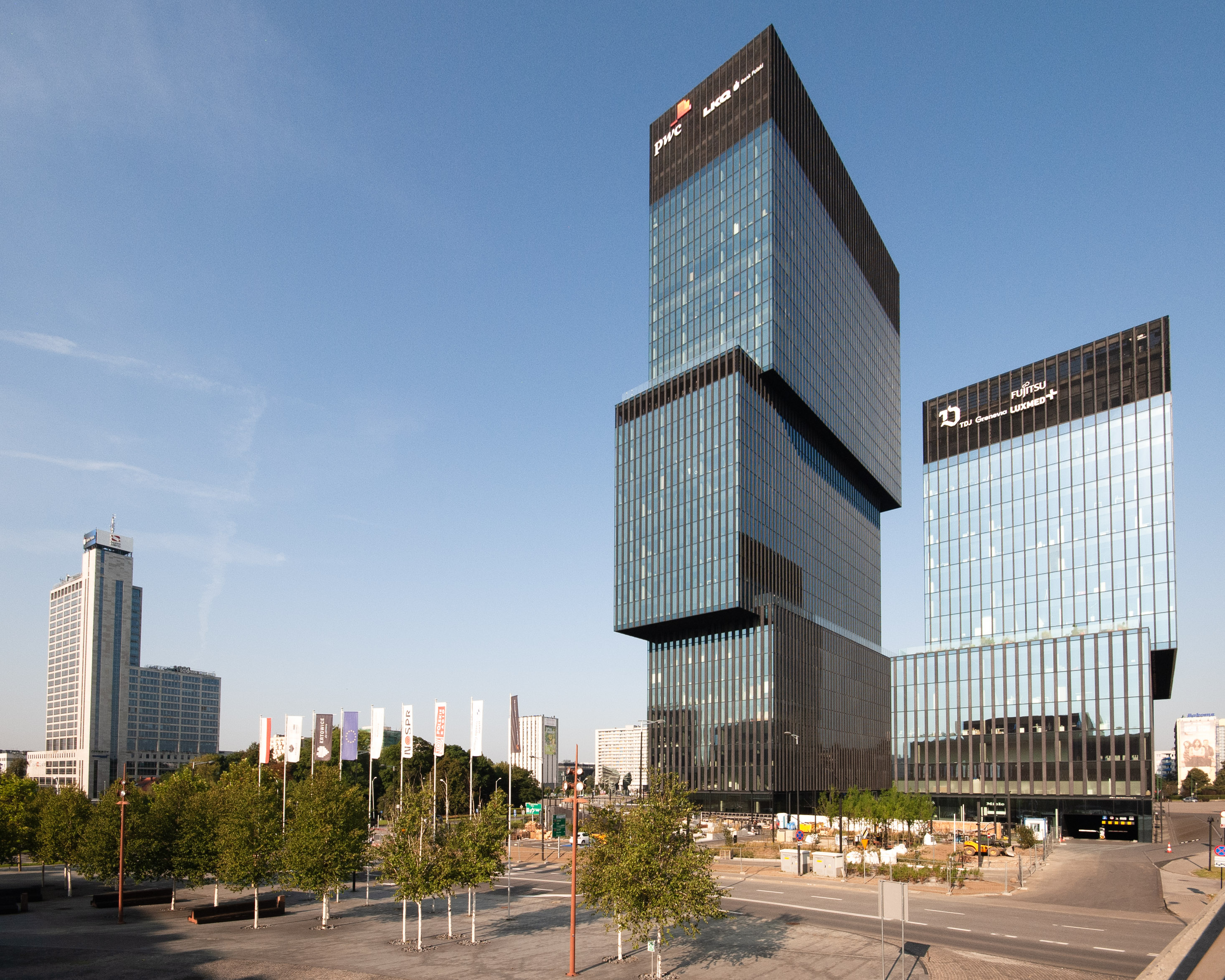
New high-rises and cultural institutions on the former site of a coal mine near downtown Katowice are a testament to the city's successful economic transformation

In the Eurostat's urban-rural typology, Poland's urbanization rate is slightly higher, though still below the European average. Eurostat estimates 61.2% of Poland's population to live in urban clusters (including 28.9% in dense urban centers), compared to the 70.4% average across the EU.

==== Metropolitan areas ====
There is no one official delimitation of metropolitan areas in Poland, and various institutions use different definitions. However, both central institutions and academics are in agreement that the following are the major metropolitan areas of Poland:

1. Warsaw - the capital and largest city of Poland, with 1.9 million official residents in city proper and 2.7-3.1 million in the metropolitan area. Warsaw is the largest economy in Poland, with the Warsaw Stock Exchange, most major financial institutions, and CEE headquarters of international companies. Warsaw is also an important educational center, with the University of Warsaw, Warsaw School of Economics and Polish Academy of Sciences located there. Warsaw metropolitan area has been growing rapidly in recent decades, eclipsing the previously larger Katowice metropolitan area around 2015.
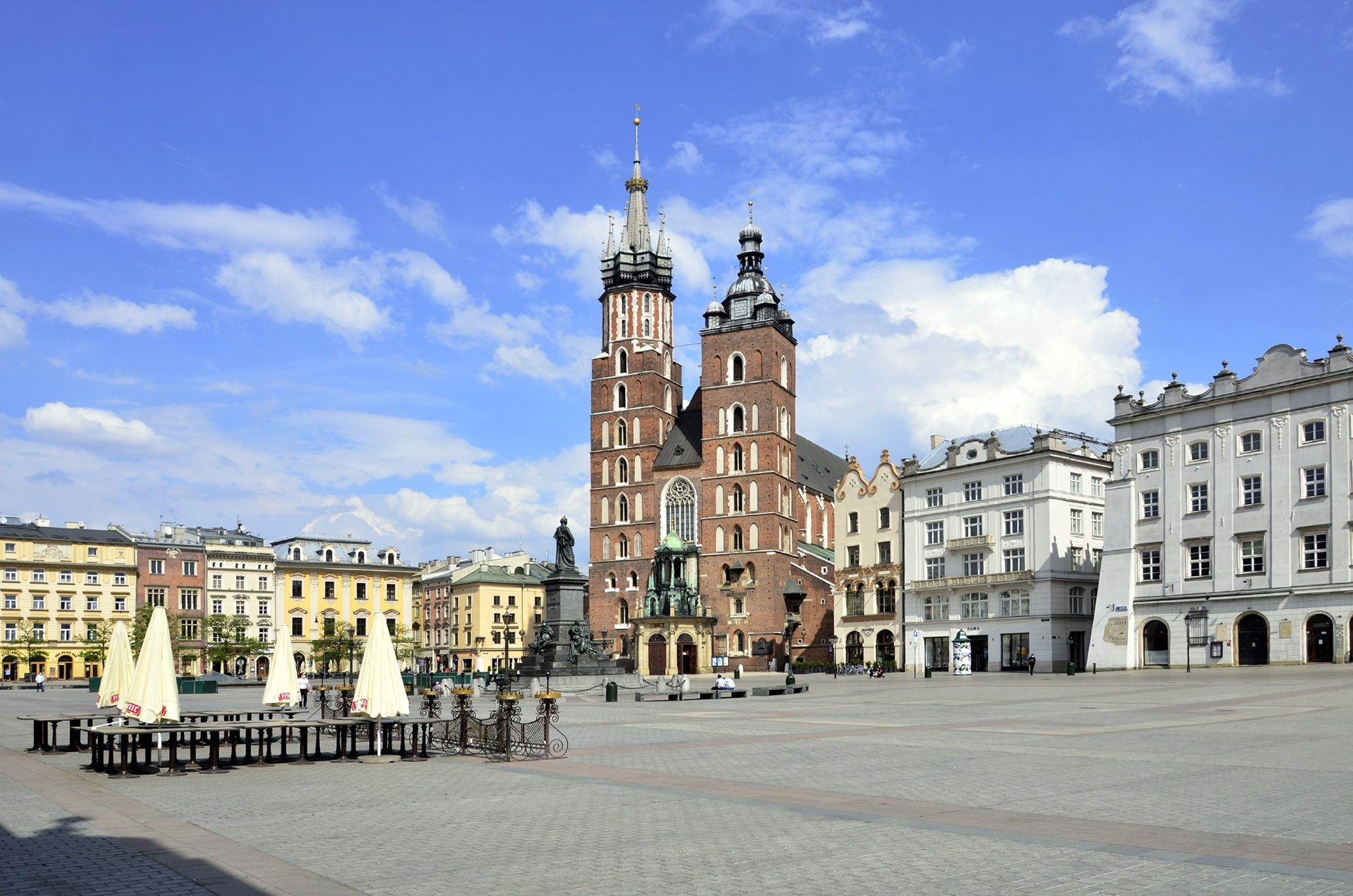
2. Kraków's old town is listed on the UNESCO World Heritage Site list and attracts millions of tourists every year
  Katowice - the center of the large Katowice urban area, with 2.2-2.7 million in the metropolitan area. Katowice area developed initially as a hub of heavy industry and coal mining. Most of the industry has been closed since. Katowice and some other cities (Gliwice, Tychy) managed to successfully transform its economies becoming a major Polish hubs of information technology, healthcare, education, finance and manufacturing, however many other cities (Bytom, Sosnowiec) experience depopulation. Katowice metropolitan area is bordering Rybnik, Bielsko-Biała and Ostrava metropolitan areas from the south and southwest, which combined create a large Katowice-Ostrava metropolitan area with 4.5-5.2 million people.
3. Kraków - the historical capital of Poland, with 0.8 million residents in city proper and 1.2 million in the metropolitan area. Kraków is one of the main tourist destinations in Poland and a is often called a cultural capital of the country. In recent decades, Kraków emerged as a major international center of back office operations through the SSC/BPO industry. Kraków is also the second largest college city in Poland after Warsaw, with the Jagiellonian University dating back to the Middle Ages.
4. Łódź - a post-industrial city in the middle of Poland, with 0.7 million people in the city proper and 1-1.2 million in the urban area. Łódź has developed in the 19th century as a center for textile manufacturing, and has been a major manufacturing hub exporting mostly towards Russia and then Soviet Union. Following the market transformations in the early 1990s, most of the industry has collapsed and Łódź struggled with high unemployment rate. In recent years, the city has embraced its industrial past and exploits its location close to Warsaw.
5. Gdańsk - one of the three major cities of the Tricity area, Gdańsk has around 0.5 million people in the city proper and 1-1.2 million in the urban area. Gdańsk has been the largest cities in Poland for most of the Middle Ages, thanks to its seaside location that fostered trade with other cities and countries in the Baltic and North Seas. Being the largest urban area in the north of the country, Gdańsk benefits from internal migration from neighboring regions.
6. Poznań - with its 0.5 million residents in city proper and 0.8-1.1 million in the metropolitan area, Poznań emerged as one of the main hubs of trade and manufacturing in Poland. Poznań area is the most entrepreneurial part of Poland, with more than 1 in 10 residents running a business. Poznań is also the prime example of suburbanization in Poland, with the suburbs around as populous as the city proper.
7. Wrocław - in recent years emerged a major immigration center, with more than 100,000 immigrants residing in the city in addition to its official population of 0.7 million and 0.9-1.1 million in the metropolitan area. Similarly to Kraków, Wrocław is a major tourist destination thanks to its medieval old town, as well as a hub of back office operations particularly in the financial industry.
8. Szczecin - with a population of 0.4 million in the city proper and 0.7-0.9 million in the metropolitan area (partially stretching to Germany), Szczecin is the second-largest city in the country's north and a major port.

Population numbers by database
Area	ESPON	Eurostat LUZ	Ministry of Regional Development	United Nations	Demographia.com	Citypopulation.de	Scientific study by T. Markowski	Scientific study by Swianiewicz, Klimska
Katowice (Katowice urban area)	3,029,000 (5,294,000)	2,710,397	3,239,200	3,069,000	2,500,000	2,775,000	2,746,000	2,733,000
Warsaw	2,785,000	2,660,406	2,680,600	2,194,000	2,030,000	2,375,000	2,631,900	2,504,000
Kraków	1,236,000	1,264,322	1,227,200	818,000	750,000	Not listed	1,257,500	1,367,000
Łódź	1,165,000	1,163,516	1,061,600	974,000	950,000	1,060,000	1,178,000	1,129,000
Gdańsk	993,000	1,105,203	1,220,800	854,000	775,000	No data	1,098,400	1,210,000
Poznań	919,000	1,018,511	1,227,200	No data	600,000	No data	1,011,200	846,000
Wrocław	861,000	1,031,439	1,136,900	No data	700,000	No data	1,029,800	956,000
Szczecin	721,000	878,314	724,700	No data	500,000	No data	No data	755,806

==== Regions ====
Poland is divided into 16 administrative divisions called voivodeship (województwa). These regions vary vastly in size, as the largest Masovian voivodeship is more than 5 times as populous and 3 times as big as the smallest Opole voivodeship.

Voivodeship	Capital	Area (km^{2})	Official population (2021)	Population density (ppl/km^{2})	Foreigners (2021)	Ukrainian refugees (2022)	Population density with foreigners (ppl/km^{2})
Lower Silesian	Wrocław	19,947	2,904,894	145.6	156,278	108,023	158.9
Kuyavian-Pomeranian	Bydgoszcz, Toruń	17,972	2,027,261	112.8	50,434	31,520	117.4
Lublin	Lublin	25,122	2,052,340	81.7	44,970	35,810	84.9
Lubusz	Zielona Góra, Gorzów Wielkopolski	13,988	991,213	70.9	58,219	31,654	77.3
Łódź	Łódź	18,218	2,410,286	132.3	101,531	60,658	141.2
Lesser Poland	Kraków	15,184	3,432,295	226.0	92,261	87,365	237.9
Masovian	Warszawa	35,559	5,514,699	155.1	365,054	204,838	171.1
Opole	Opole	9,411	954,133	101.4	31,348	21,033	107.0
Subcarpathian	Rzeszów	17,845	2,093,360	117.3	22,571	29,742	120.2
Podlaskie	Białystok	20,187	1,154,283	57.2	26,190	14,464	59.2
Pomeranian	Gdańsk	18,336	2,357,320	128.6	92,538	69,519	137.4
Silesian	Katowice	12,334	4,402,950	357.0	119,780	94,444	374.3
Świętokrzyskie	Kielce	11,709	1,196,557	102.2	15,815	14,812	104.8
Warmian-Masurian	Olsztyn	24,174	1,382,232	57.2	21,126	18,464	58.8
Greater Poland	Poznań	29,827	3,504,579	117.5	165,221	88,730	126.0
West Pomeranian	Szczecin	22,907	1,657,716	72.4	70,443	47,044	77.5
Poland	Warsaw	312,720	38,036,118	121.6	1,433,779	958,120	129.3

=== Fertility ===
==== Fertility before 1921 ====
TFR of Poland overtime to 2016

The total fertility rate is the number of children born per woman. It is based on fairly good data for the entire period. Source: Gapminder Foundation.

Years	1800	1801	1802	1803	1804	1805	1806	1807	1808	1809	1810
Total Fertility Rate in Poland	6.28	6.26	6.25	6.23	6.22	6.2	6.19	6.17	6.16	6.14	6.12

Years	1811	1812	1813	1814	1815	1816	1817	1818	1819	1820
Total Fertility Rate in Poland	6.11	6.09	6.08	6.06	6.05	6.03	6.03	6.16	6.3	6.03

Years	1821	1822	1823	1824	1825	1826	1827	1828	1829	1830
Total Fertility Rate in Poland	6.3	6.03	5.76	5.49	6.83	6.16	6.3	6.22	6.14	6.06

Years	1831	1832	1833	1834	1835	1836	1837	1838	1839	1840
Total Fertility Rate in Poland	5.98	5.9	6.43	6.83	5.9	6.3	6.57	6.03	6.43	6.57

Years	1841	1842	1843	1844	1845	1846	1847	1848	1849	1850
Total Fertility Rate in Poland	6.16	6.43	6.3	6.03	5.36	5.49	5.09	4.82	5.49	5.63

Years	1851	1852	1853	1854	1855	1856	1857	1858	1859	1860
Total Fertility Rate in Poland	5.63	5.49	5.63	5.36	4.82	5.36	5.76	6.3	6.57	6.57

Years	1861	1862	1863	1864	1865	1866	1867	1868	1869	1870
Total Fertility Rate in Poland	6.43	6.97	6.57	6.2	5.83	5.46	5.09	5.63	5.63	6.16

Years	1871	1872	1873	1874	1875	1876	1877	1878	1879	1880
Total Fertility Rate in Poland	5.76	5.49	5.76	5.76	5.49	5.49	5.23	5.23	5.36	5.23

Years	1881	1882	1883	1884	1885	1886	1887	1888	1889	1890
Total Fertility Rate in Poland	5.09	5.23	5.23	5.09	5.36	5.36	5.36	5.49	5.76	5.63

Years	1891	1892	1893	1894	1895	1896	1897	1898	1899	1900
Total Fertility Rate in Poland	5.63	5.36	5.63	5.9	5.9	5.76	5.63	5.49	5.49	5.49

Years	1901	1902	1903	1904	1905	1906	1907	1908	1909	1910
Total Fertility Rate in Poland	5.36	5.36	5.09	5.09	4.96	5.09	5.09	4.96	4.96	4.82

Years	1911	1912	1913	1914	1915	1916	1917	1918	1919	1920
Total Fertility Rate in Poland	4.69	4.56	4.69	4.82	3.89	3.62	3.22	3.22	4.42	4.69

== Vital statistics ==
=== Vital statistics from 1921 to 1938 ===
Year	Average population	Live births	Deaths	Natural change	Crude birth rate (per 1000)	Crude death rate (per 1000)	Natural change (per 1000)	Total fertility rates (Note: In fertility rates, 2.1 and above is a stable population and has been marked blue, 2 and below leads to an aging population and the result is that the population decreases.)
1921	27,224,000	890,400	568,300	322,100	32.7	20.9	11.8	4.40
1922	27,846,000	983,100	554,600	482,500	35.3	19.9	15.4	4.73
1923	28,480,000	1,014,700	493,800	520,900	35.6	17.3	18.3	4.82
1924	29,007,000	1,000,100	519,200	480,900	34.5	17.9	16.6	4.69
1925	29,475,000	1,036,600	492,200	544,400	35.2	16.7	18.5	4.74
1926	29,906,000	989,100	532,700	456,400	33.1	17.8	15.3	4.44
1927	30,302,000	958,733	525,633	433,100	31.6	17.3	14.3	4.23
1928	30,693,000	990,993	504,207	486,786	32.3	16.4	15.9	4.29
1929	31,084,000	994,101	518,929	475,172	32.0	16.7	15.3	4.26
1930	31,490,000	1,022,811	488,417	534,394	32.5	15.5	17.0	4.33
1931	31,935,000	964,573	493,703	470,870	30.2	15.5	14.7	4.05
1932	32,394,000	934,663	486,548	448,115	28.9	15.0	13.8	3.87
1933	32,823,000	868,675	466,210	402,465	26.5	14.2	12.3	3.55
1934	33,223,000	881,615	479,684	401,931	26.5	14.4	12.1	3.56
1935	33,616,000	876,667	470,998	405,669	26.1	14.0	12.1	3.50
1936	34,020,000	892,320	482,633	409,687	26.2	14.2	12.0	3.51
1937	34,441,000	856,064	481,594	374,470	24.9	14.0	10.9	3.34
1938	34,849,000	849,873	479,602	370,271	24.4	13.8	10.6	3.26

No reliable data are available during WWII.

=== After World War II ===
	Average population (December 31)	Live births	Deaths	Natural change	Crude birth rate (per 1000)	Crude death rate (per 1000)	Natural change (per 1000)	Crude migration change (per 1000)	Crude population change (per 1000)	Total fertility rates	Life expectancy (males)	Life expectancy (females)	Share of births outside marriage	Immigration	Emigration	Net external migration
1946	23,777,000	570,000	335,000	235,000	24.0	14.1	9.9			3.06						
1947	23,970,000	630,000	271,000	359,000	26.3	11.3	15.0	-6.9	8.1	3.51						
1948	23,980,000	704,772	268,000	436,772	29.4	11.2	18.2	-17.8	0.4	3.93						
1949	24,410,000	725,061	284,000	441,061	29.7	11.6	18.1	-0.5	17.6	3.94						
1950	24,824,000	763,108	288,685	474,423	30.7	11.6	19.1	-2.4	16.7	3.71	56.07	61.68				
1951	25,271,000	783,597	312,314	471,283	31.0	12.4	18.6	-1	17.7	3.75	55.11	60.67				
1952	25,753,000	778,962	286,730	492,232	30.2	11.1	19.1	-0.4	18.7	3.67	57.59	63.07				
1953	26,255,000	779,000	266,527	512,473	29.7	10.2	19.5	-0.4	19.1	3.61	59.58	65.05				
1954	26,761,000	778,054	276,406	501,648	29.1	10.3	18.7	0.2	18.9	3.58	59.80	65.06				
1955	27,281,000	793,847	261,576	532,271	29.1	9.6	19.5	-0.4	19.1	3.61	60.82	66.19				
1956	27,815,000	779,835	249,606	530,229	28.0	9.0	19.1		19.2	3.61	62.29	67.52				
1957	28,310,000	782,319	269,137	513,182	27.6	9.5	18.1	-0.6	17.5	3.49	61.20	66.70				
1958	28,770,000	752,600	241,435	511,165	26.2	8.4	17.8	-1.8	16	3.36	63.08	68.57				
1959	29,240,000	722,928	252,430	470,498	24.7	8.6	16.1	0	16.1	3.22	62.71	68.30				
1960	29,561,000	669,485	224,167	445,318	22.6	7.6	15.1	-4.2	10.9	2.98	64.94	70.60				
1961	29,965,000	627,624	227,759	399,865	20.9	7.6	13.3	0.1	13.5	2.83	64.91	70.78				
1962	30,324,000	599,505	239,199	360,306	19.8	7.9	11.9	0	11.8	2.72	64.53	70.49				
1963	30,691,000	588,235	230,072	358,163	19.2	7.5	11.7	0.3	12	2.70	65.41	71.52				
1964	31,161,000	562,855	235,919	326,936	18.1	7.6	10.5	4.6	15.1	2.57	65.78	71.60				
1965	31,496,000	546,362	232,421	313,941	17.3	7.4	10.0	0.7	10.6	2.52	66.58	72.40				
1966	31,698,000	530,307	232,945	297,362	16.7	7.3	9.4	-3.0	6.4	2.33	66.87	72.85				
1967	31,944,000	520,383	247,705	272,678	16.3	7.8	8.5	-0.8	7.7	2.30	66.44	72.61				
1968	32,426,000	524,174	244,115	280,059	16.2	7.5	8.6	6.2	14.9	2.24	67.04	73.55				
1969	32,555,000	531,135	262,823	268,312	16.3	8.1	8.2	-4.2	4	2.20	66.50	73.09				
1970	32,680,000	545,973	266,799	279,174	16.8	8.2	8.6	-9.5	-0.9	2.22	66.62	73.33	5.0			
1971	32,805,000	562,341	283,702	278,639	17.1	8.6	8.5	0	8.5	2.25	66.13	73.25				
1972	33,068,000	575,725	265,250	310,475	17.4	8.0	9.4	-1.4	8	2.24	67.32	74.17				
1973	33,363,000	598,559	277,188	321,371	17.9	8.3	9.6	-0.8	8.8	2.24	67.15	74.30				
1974	33,691,000	621,080	277,085	343,995	18.4	8.2	10.2	-0.5	9.7	2.26	67.80	74.64				
1975	34,022,000	643,772	296,896	346,876	18.9	8.7	10.2	-0.5	9.7	2.27	67.02	74.26	4.7			
1976	34,362,000	670,140	304,057	366,083	19.5	8.8	10.7	-0.8	9.9	2.31	66.92	74.55				
1977	34,698,000	662,582	312,956	349,626	19.1	9.0	10.1	-0.4	9.7	2.23	66.49	74.50				
1978	35,010,000	666,336	325,104	341,232	19.0	9.3	9.7	-0.8	8.9	2.21	66.36	74.53				
1979	35,257,000	688,293	323,048	365,245	19.5	9.2	10.4	-3.4	7	2.28	66.79	74.91	4.8			
1980	35,578,000	692,798	350,203	342,595	19.5	9.8	9.6	-0.6	9	2.28	66.01	74.44				
1981	35,902,000	678,696	328,923	349,773	18.9	9.2	9.7	-0.7	9	2.24	67.10	75.24				
1982	36,227,000	702,351	334,869	367,482	19.4	9.2	10.1	-0.4	9	2.34	67.24	75.20				
1983	36,571,000	720,756	349,388	371,368	19.7	9.6	10.2	-0.7	9.4	2.41	67.04	75.16				
1984	36,914,000	699,041	364,883	334,158	18.9	9.9	9.1	0.2	9.3	2.36	66.84	74.97				
1985	37,203,000	677,576	381,458	296,118	18.2	10.3	8.0	-0.2	7.8	2.33	66.50	74.81	5.0			
1986	37,456,000	634,748	376,316	258,432	16.9	10.0	6.9	-0.1	6.8	2.21	66.76	75.13				
1987	37,664,000	605,492	378,365	227,127	16.1	10.0	6.0	-0.5	5.5	2.15	66.81	75.20				
1988	37,862,000	587,741	370,821	216,920	15.5	9.8	5.7	-0.5	5.2	2.12	67.15	75.67				
1989	37,963,000	562,530	381,173	181,357	14.8	10.0	4.8	-2.1	2.7	2.08	66.76	75.45				
1990	38,119,000	545,817	390,343	155,474	14.3	10.2	4.1	0	4.1	2.04	66.23	75.24	6.2			
1991	38,245,000	547,719	405,716	142,003	14.3	10.6	3.7	-0.4	3.3	2.05	65.88	75.06	6.6			
1992	38,365,000	515,214	394,729	120,485	13.4	10.3	3.1	0	3.1	1.91	66.47	75.48	7.2			
1993	38,459,000	494,310	392,259	102,051	12.9	10.2	2.7	-0.3	2.4	1.86	67.17	75.81	8.2			
1994	38,544,000	481,285	386,398	94,887	12.5	10.0	2.5	-0.3	2.2	1.78	67.50	76.08	9.0			
1995	38,588,000	443,109	386,084	57,025	11.5	10.0	1.5	-0.3	1.1	1.65	67.62	76.39	9.5			
1996	38,618,000	428,203	385,496	42,707	11.1	10.0	1.1	-0.3	0.8	1.58	68.12	76.57	10.2			
1997	38,659,979	412,635	380,201	32,434	10.7	9.8	0.8	0	0.8	1.52	68.45	76.99	11.0			
1998	38,666,983	395,619	375,354	20,265	10.2	9.7	0.5	-0.1	0.4	1.44	68.87	77.34	11.6			
1999	38,634,799	382,002	381,415	587	9.9	9.9	0.0	-0.3	-0.3	1.37	68.83	77.49	11.7			
2000	38,623,119	378,348	368,028	10,320	9.8	9.5	0.3	-0.4	-0.1	1.35	69.74	78.00	12.1			
2001	38,572,026	368,205	363,220	4,985	9.5	9.4	0.1	-1.9	-2.0	1.32	70.21	78.38	13.1			
2002	38,548,360	353,765	359,486	-5,721	9.2	9.3	-0.2	-0.6	-0.8	1.25	70.40	78.80	14.4	6,587	24,532	-17,945
2003	38,520,437	351,072	365,230	-14,158	9.1	9.5	-0.4	-0.4	-0.7	1.22	70.50	78.90	15.8	7,048	20,813	-13,765
2004	38,503,664	356,131	363,522	-7,391	9.2	9.4	-0.2	-0.2	-0.4	1.23	70.70	79.20	17.1	9,495	18,877	-9,382
2005	38,486,884	364,383	368,285	-3,902	9.5	9.6	-0.1	-0.3	-0.4	1.24	70.80	79.40	18.5	9,364	22,242	-12,878
2006	38,455,308	374,244	369,686	4,558	9.7	9.6	0.1	-0.9	-0.8	1.27	70.90	79.60	18.9	10,802	46,936	-36,134
2007	38,445,470	387,873	377,226	10,647	10.1	9.9	0.3	-0.5	-0.3	1.31	71.00	79.70	19.5	14,995	35,480	-20,485
2008	38,465,705	414,499	379,399	35,100	10.8	9.9	0.9	-0.4	0.5	1.39	71.30	80.00	19.9	15,275	30,140	-14,865
2009	38,497,158	417,589	384,940	32,649	10.8	10.0	0.8	0	0.8	1.40	71.50	80.10	20.2	17,424	18,620	-1,196
2010	38,529,866	413,300	378,478	34,822	10.7	9.8	0.9	-0.1	0.8	1.38	72.10	80.60	20.6	15,246	17,360	-2,114
2011	38,538,447	388,416	375,501	12,915	10.1	9.7	0.3	-0.1	0.2	1.30	72.40	80.90	21.2	15,524	19,858	-4,334
2012	38,533,299	387,858	384,788	3,070	10.1	10.0	0.1	-0.2	-0.1	1.30	72.70	81.00	22.3	14,583	21,200	-6,617
2013	38,495,659	369,576	387,312	-17,736	9.6	10.1	-0.5	-0.5	-1	1.26	73.10	81.10	23.4	12,199	32,103	-19,904
2014	38,478,602	375,160	376,467	-1,307	9.7	9.8	-0.0	-0.4	-0.4	1.29	73.80	81.60	24.2	12,330	28,080	-15,750
2015	38,437,239	369,308	394,921	-25,613	9.6	10.3	-0.7	-0.4	-1.1	1.29	73.60	81.60	24.6	12,330	28,080	-15,750
2016	38,432,992	382,257	388,009	-5,752	9.9	10.1	-0.1	0	-0.1	1.36	73.90	81.90	25.0	13,475	11,970	1,505
2017	38,433,558	401,982	402,852	-870	10.5	10.5	-0.0	0	0	1.45	74.00	81.80	24.1	13,324	11,888	1,436
2018	38,411,148	388,178	414,200	-26,022	10.1	10.8	-0.7	0.1	-0.6	1.44	73.80	81.70	26.4	15,461	11,849	3,612
2019	38,382,576	374,954	409,709	-34,755	9.8	10.7	-0.9	0.2	-0.7	1.42	74.10	81.80	25.4	16,909	10,726	6,183
2020	38,088,564	355,309	477,355	-122,046	9.3	12.5	-3.2	-4.5	-7.7	1.39	72.60	80.70	26.4	13,263	8,780	4,483
2021	37,907,704	331,511	519,517	-188,006	8.7	13.6	-5.0	0.2	-4.8	1.33	71.80	79.70	26.7	15,409	12,005	3,404
2022	37,766,327	305,132	448,448	-143,316	8.1	11.9	-3.8	0.1	-3.7	1.26	73.40	81.10	28.1	15,572	13,633	1,939
2023	37,636,508	272,451	409,036	-136,585	7.2	10.9	-3.7	0.2	-3.5	1.16	74.70	82.00	28.7	16,707	9,941	6,766
2024	37,489,087	251,782	408,504	-156,722	6.7	10.9	-4.2	0.3	-3.9	1.10	74.90	82.30	29.0	19,515	10,214	9,301
2025	37,332,000	238,264	405,747	-167,483	6.4	10.9	-4.5	0.3	-4.2	1.07(e)				21,087	10,181	10,906

=== Current vital statistics ===
Period	Live births	Deaths	Natural increase
January—September 2025	181,600	302,300	–120,700
January—September 2026	176,000	305,000	–129,000
Difference	▼ –5,600 (–3.08%)	▲ +2,700 (+0.89%)	▼ –8,300

View source data.

Birth and death rates of Poland in 1950-2008

=== Total fertility rates by voivodeship ===
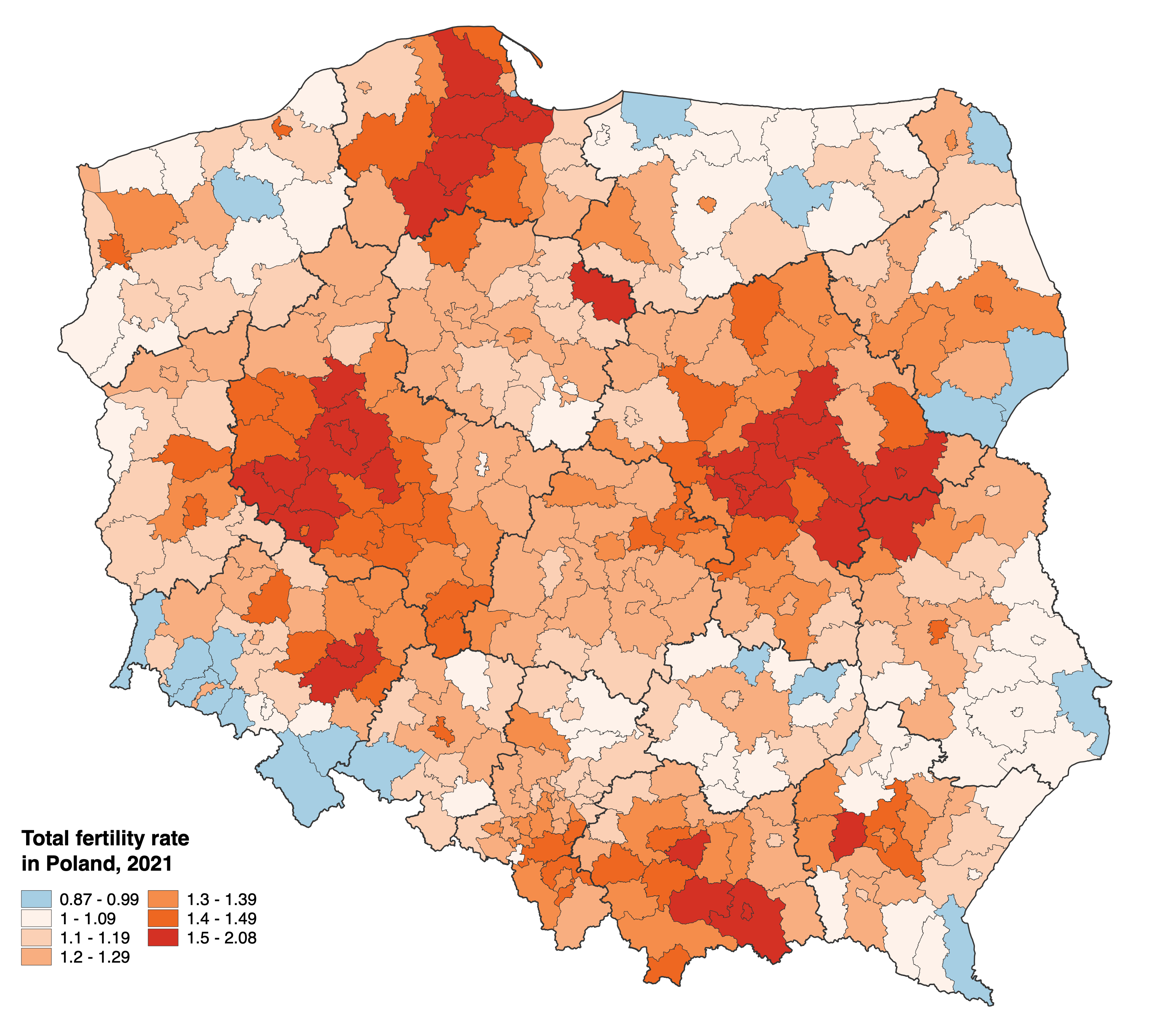
Total fertility rate varies significantly by county in Poland. In 2021, Kashubia and Nowy Sącz regions had the highest fertility rate, along with metropolitan areas of Warsaw and Poznań. The lowest, sub-1 fertility was recorded in the Sudetes.

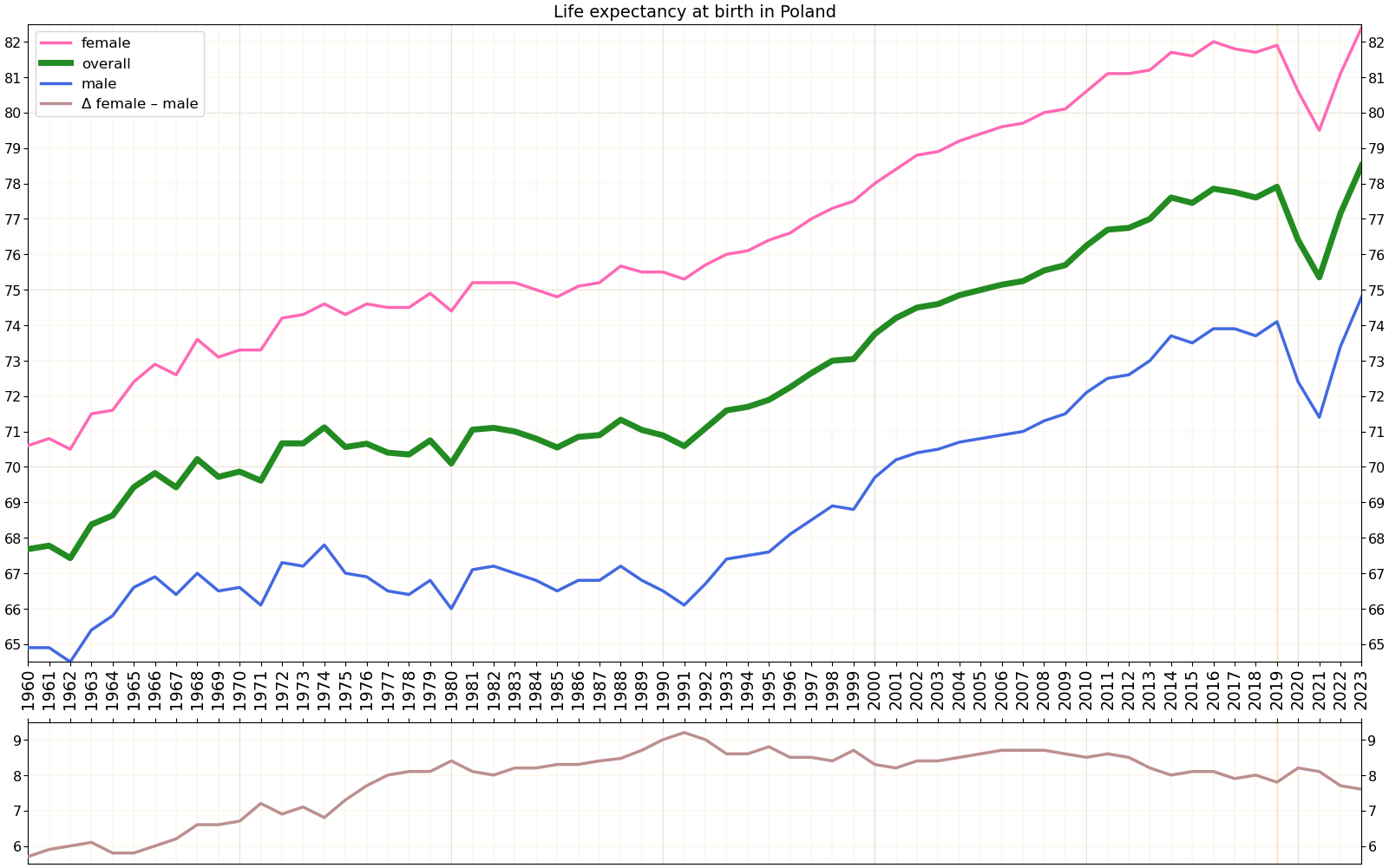
Life expectancy at birth in Poland

2024
voivodeship	TFR
Masovian	1.31
Podlaskie	1.21
Lesser Poland	1.20
Podkarpackie	1.20
Pomeranian	1.19
Greater Poland	1.19
Lublin	1.14
Łódź	1.13
Warmian–Masurian	1.12
Poland	1.10
Lubusz	1.10
Kuyavian–Pomeranian	1.09
Opolskie	1.08
Silesian	1.08
Świętokrzyskie	1.07
West Pomeranian	1.07
Lower Silesian	1.04

== Immigration and foreign nationals ==
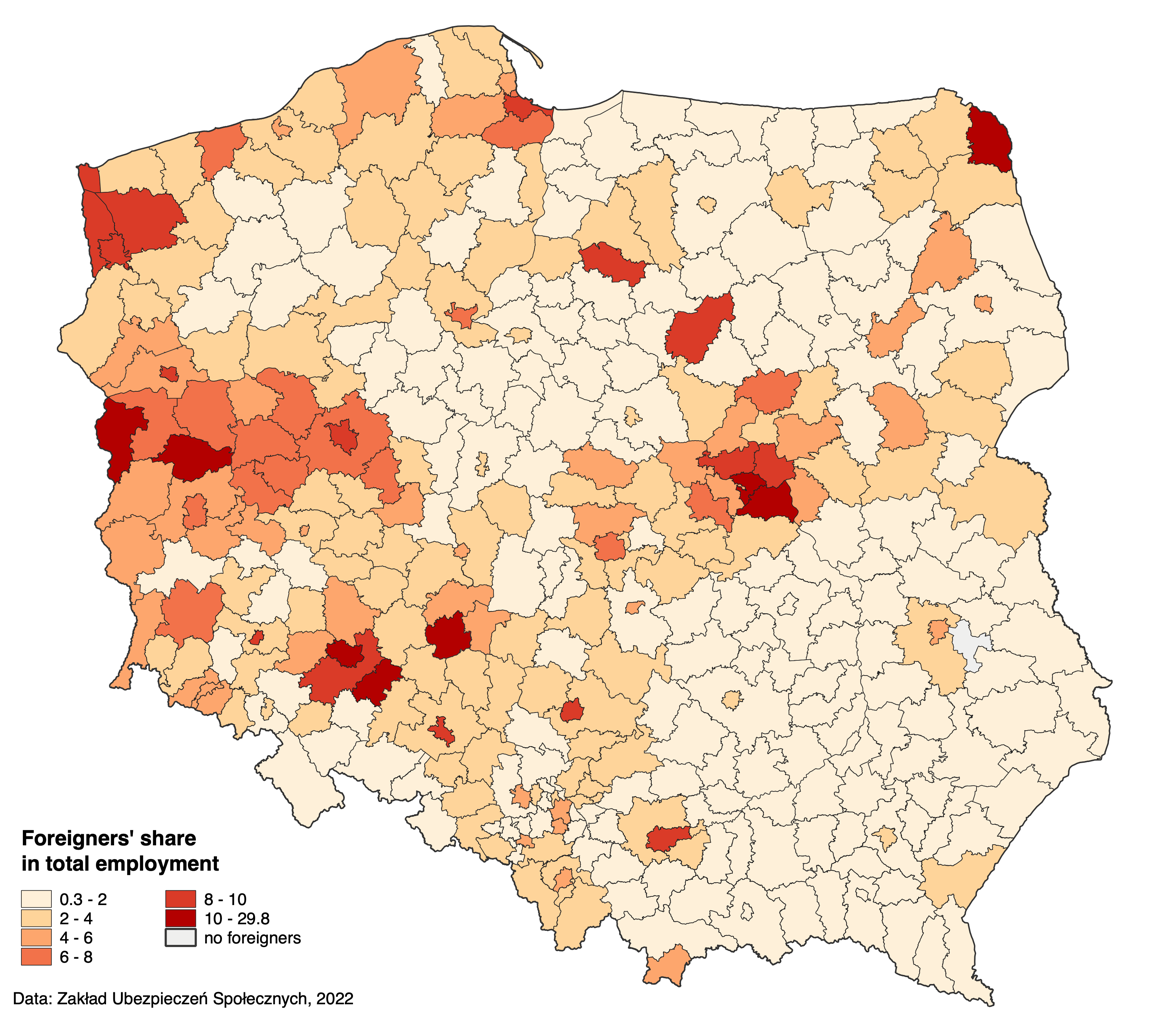
Foreigners in Poland mostly settle in the largest metropolitan areas and in the western part of the country

Historically an emigrant country, Poland has seen an uptick in immigration only after 2014, when the growing economy started attracting foreign workforce, particularly from neighboring Ukraine whose economy has been affected by the 2014 war. Poland's official statistics regarding immigration are scattered and incomplete, and the complicated immigration system with many different routes to immigrate makes assessing true size of immigration to Poland challenging.

=== Census data ===
Główny Urząd Statystyczny (GUS), the Polish central statistics office, published multiple separate counts of foreign nationals living in Poland for the 2021 census. GUS counted 445,176 foreign nationals towards Poland's usually resident population (1.2% share) and 111,814 foreign nationals towards Poland's official population (0.3% share). It also counted 1,433,779 foreign nationals as temporarily living in Poland (of whom 309,309 lived in Poland for more than 12 months). It is unclear what is the overlap of these populations.

Largest groups of foreign residents as of 2026
Nationality	Resident population
Ukraine	1,549,908
Belarus	136,155
India	25,265
Georgia	19,890
Russia	18,037
Vietnam	15,035
Turkey	13,578
Colombia	12,009
Uzbekistan	11,012
Philippines	10,544
Nepal	9,351
Moldova	8,320
Bangladesh	6,917
China	5,953
Azerbaijan	5,821
Indonesia	5,016
Armenia	4,903
Kazakhstan	3,878
Zimbabwe	3,800
South Korea	3,640

=== Work-based migration ===
Most foreigners from outside of the European Union immigrate to Poland via various kinds of work schemes. There are two primary types: a work permit (zezwolenie na pracę) and a "declaration of entrusting work to a foreigner" (oświadczenie o powierzeniu wykonywania pracy cudzoziemcowi).

=== Net migration ===
Permanent Migration in Poland
Year	Immigration	Emigration	Net Migration
2019	16,909	10,726	+6,183
2020	13,263	8,780	+4,483
2021	15,409	12,005	+3,404
2022	15,572	13,633	+1,939
2023	16,707	9,941	+6,766
2024	19,515	10,214	+9,301
Note: Does not include temporary migration.

==== Work permits ====
Work permits can be issued to any foreigner from outside of the European Union who is not a refugee and does not already have a residence permit in Poland. Work permits require a labor market test and can be issued for up to 3 years. In 2022, 61.1% of work permits were issued for at least 12 months (including 49.2% issued for 24 months and more) while 38.5% were issued for 6–12 months. Less than 0.4% were issued for less than 6 months.

Work permits issued each year by country of citizenship
Country	2011 (Men/Women)	2012 (Men/Women)	2013 (Men/Women)	2014 (Men/Women)	2015 (Men/Women)	2016 (Men/Women)	2017 (Men/Women)	2018 (Men/Women)	2019 (Men/Women)	2020 (Men/Women)	2021 (Men/Women)	2022 (Men/Women)	2023 (Men/Women)	2024 (Men/Women)	2025 (Men/Women)	Total (Men/Women)
Ukraine	18,669 (11,293/7,376)	20,295 (11,866/8,429)	20,416 (11,460/8,956)	26,315 (16,015/10,300)	50,465 (35,317/15,148)	106,223 (75,839/30,384)	192,547 (137,495/55,052)	238,334 (173,946/64,388)	330,495 (235,889/94,606)	295,272 (204,343/90,929)	325,779 (230,143/95,636)	85,074 (60,943/24,131)	7,298 (4,148/3,150)	3,960 (2,306/1,654)	2,988 (1,680/1,308)	1,724,130 (1,212,593/511,447)
India	1,055 (995/60)	1,090 (999/91)	1,300 (1,184/116)	1,242 (1,096/146)	1,425 (1,272/153)	1,772 (1,538/234)	3,938 (3,539/399)	8,362 (7,775/587)	8,063 (7,412/651)	8,184 (7,696/488)	15,382 (14,400/982)	41,640 (39,706/1,934)	45,998 (44,238/1,760)	33,928 (32,455/1,473)	29,524 (28,344/1,180)	202,903 (192,649/10,254)
Belarus	1,725 (1,427/298)	1,949 (1,597/352)	2,004 (1,641/363)	1,834 (1,540/294)	2,037 (1,852/185)	4,870 (4,557/313)	10,518 (9,684/834)	19,233 (17,700/1,533)	27,130 (24,216/2,914)	27,304 (23,847/3,457)	34,895 (30,398/4,497)	18,418 (15,868/2,550)	6,383 (5,083/1,300)	4,253 (3,288/965)	2,860 (2,263/597)	165,413 (144,961/20,452)
Nepal	1,202 (928/274)	486 (384/102)	525 (412/113)	402 (343/59)	596 (507/89)	1,211 (1,077/134)	7,075 (6,239/836)	19,912 (17,758/2,154)	9,175 (7,996/1,109)	5,708 (4,917/791)	10,873 (9,439/1,434)	20,045 (17,685/2,360)	35,287 (30,339/4,948)	31,553 (27,128/4,425)	18,805 (15,969/2,836)	162,855 (141,191/21,664)
Philippines	277 (130/147)	181 (79/102)	227 (61/166)	246 (128/118)	179 (67/112)	249 (116/133)	733 (330/403)	2,057 (1,317/740)	6,317 (3,796/2,521)	7,391 (4,165/3,226)	13,317 (6,898/6,419)	22,557 (11,066/11,491)	29,154 (15,589/13,565)	37,988 (23,621/14,367)	29,576 (18,328/11,248)	150,449 (85,691/64,758)
Uzbekistan	619 (606/13)	958 (893/65)	948 (859/89)	1,060 (970/90)	1,433 (1,293/140)	836 (796/40)	1,409 (1,338/71)	2,634 (2,539/95)	6,309 (6,048/261)	5,873 (5,593/280)	15,040 (14,228/812)	33,373 (31,481/1,892)	27,959 (26,623/1,336)	26,073 (25,017/1,056)	18,269 (17,615/654)	142,793 (135,899/6,894)
Bangladesh	680 (667/13)	233 (225/8)	314 (308/6)	283 (280/3)	319 (311/8)	721 (714/7)	2,412 (2,342/70)	8,341 (8,207/134)	6,986 (6,873/113)	3,758 (3,680/78)	7,535 (7,468/67)	13,539 (13,415/124)	27,896 (27,645/251)	17,580 (17,397/183)	8,906 (8,733/173)	99,503 (98,265/1,238)
Turkey	1,187 (1,130/57)	1,063 (1,022/41)	967 (905/62)	689 (644/45)	550 (506/44)	672 (615/57)	1,228 (1,131/97)	1,481 (1,378/103)	2,936 (2,824/112)	2,641 (2,520/121)	7,400 (7,015/385)	25,004 (23,827/1,177)	25,934 (24,162/1,772)	15,051 (13,882/1,169)	6,276 (5,714/562)	93,079 (87,275/5,804)
Colombia	23 (20/3)	32 (24/8)	30 (21/9)	28 (22/6)	25 (18/7)	29 (20/9)	48 (38/10)	91 (77/14)	156 (121/35)	190 (138/52)	244 (184/60)	4,129 (3,187/942)	11,945 (9,041/2,904)	37,987 (27,633/10,354)	37,337 (26,034/11,303)	92,294 (66,578/25,716)
Indonesia	77 (46/31)	88 (44/44)	100 (25/75)	94 (21/73)	75 (22/53)	111 (48/63)	148 (52/96)	352 (227/125)	2,023 (1,669/354)	3,885 (3,438/447)	7,924 (6,667/1,257)	10,011 (8,489/1,522)	9,405 (7,808/1,597)	14,071 (11,489/2,582)	13,502 (10,728/2,774)	61,866 (50,773/11,093)
Vietnam	2,504 (1,610/894)	2,302 (1,475/827)	2,230 (1,422/808)	2,369 (1,595/774)	732 (530/202)	439 (327/112)	658 (496/162)	1,313 (1,032/281)	3,367 (2,793/574)	2,992 (2,323/669)	3,428 (2,575/853)	5,908 (4,354/1,554)	9,854 (7,378/2,476)	8,291 (6,209/2,082)	5,556 (4,129/1,427)	51,943 (38,248/13,695)
Kazakhstan	282 (256/26)	104 (66/38)	118 (72/46)	126 (80/46)	74 (46/28)	112 (82/30)	321 (229/92)	803 (634/169)	1,689 (1,255/434)	2,464 (1,780/684)	4,597 (3,372/1,225)	8,883 (6,796/2,087)	10,298 (7,584/2,714)	11,155 (7,624/3,531)	8,622 (5,841/2,781)	49,648 (35,717/13,931)
Moldova	1,017 (716/301)	616 (463/153)	699 (501/198)	1,027 (696/331)	1,488 (985/503)	2,844 (1,967/877)	3,792 (2,766/1,026)	6,035 (4,499/1,536)	8,341 (6,138/2,203)	7,616 (5,548/2,068)	7,960 (5,969/1,991)	1,828 (1,441/387)	245 (210/35)	170 (129/41)	126 (98/28)	43,804 (32,126/11,678)
Turkmenistan	2 (1/1)	3 (2/1)	4 (3/1)	6 (6/0)	5 (4/1)	4 (4/0)	16 (14/2)	42 (35/7)	317 (296/21)	961 (891/70)	2,654 (2,322/332)	11,919 (10,258/1,661)	8,779 (7,795/984)	10,173 (8,936/1,237)	6,990 (6,235/755)	41,875 (36,802/5,073)
Azerbaijan	55 (47/8)	78 (65/13)	96 (80/16)	103 (90/13)	116 (99/17)	193 (167/26)	1,336 (1,101/235)	3,302 (2,906/366)	3,183 (2,939/244)	2,125 (1,937/188)	3,796 (3,414/382)	7,769 (7,118/651)	8,206 (7,584/622)	6,160 (5,742/418)	3,877 (3,603/274)	40,395 (33,319/3,473)
Georgia	157 (114/43)	174 (131/43)	203 (165/38)	225 (172/53)	88 (68/20)	142 (113/29)	398 (355/43)	2,752 (2,488/264)	7,438 (6,479/959)	8,213 (7,033/1,180)	9,288 (7,819/1,469)	4,285 (3,792/493)	819 (753/66)	482 (421/61)	478 (417/61)	35,142 (30,320/4,822)
Kyrgyzstan	28 (14/14)	36 (27/9)	68 (40/28)	133 (93/40)	42 (29/13)	19 (14/5)	81 (57/24)	654 (565/89)	1,283 (828/455)	1,095 (710/385)	2,468 (2,036/432)	8,051 (7,136/915)	6,487 (5,531/956)	9,090 (7,250/1,840)	4,864 (4,000/864)	34,399 (28,330/6,069)
China	5,854 (4,137/1,717)	3,247 (2,105/1,142)	3,089 (2,041/1,048)	2,133 (1,439/694)	1,288 (880/408)	1,205 (885/320)	1,179 (895/284)	1,473 (1,135/338)	1,935 (1,447/488)	1,380 (1,065/315)	1,725 (1,298/427)	2,233 (1,664/569)	2,618 (1,933/685)	1,829 (1,349/480)	1,908 (1,418/490)	33,096 (23,748/9,405)
Pakistan	184 (172/12)	366 (354/12)	233 (223/10)	274 (264/10)	184 (174/10)	187 (179/8)	427 (403/24)	1,065 (1,026/39)	911 (877/34)	815 (799/16)	1,528 (1,478/50)	4,645 (4,555/90)	7,393 (7,291/102)	8,398 (8,302/96)	3,921 (3,847/74)	30,531 (29,944/587)
Russia	549 (324/225)	719 (409/310)	822 (483/339)	654 (385/269)	579 (386/193)	1,008 (738/270)	1,433 (1,028/405)	1,903 (1,402/501)	2,862 (2,135/727)	3,371 (2,466/905)	6,244 (4,504/1,740)	2,330 (1,817/513)	2,407 (1,697/710)	2,030 (1,447/583)	1,390 (1,001/389)	28,301 (20,222/8,079)
Zimbabwe	7 (7/0)	12 (12/0)	12 (12/0)	9 (9/0)	3 (3/0)	9 (8/1)	12 (8/4)	13 (11/2)	40 (27/13)	116 (57/59)	360 (244/116)	815 (658/157)	5,017 (4,634/383)	8,348 (7,306/1,042)	10,057 (8,938/1,119)	24,830 (21,934/2,896)
Tajikistan	91 (87/4)	51 (48/3)	45 (42/3)	103 (93/10)	59 (56/3)	98 (92/6)	353 (335/18)	868 (846/22)	1,323 (1,277/46)	1,186 (1,134/52)	2,532 (2,434/98)	5,380 (5,194/186)	3,395 (3,284/111)	3,913 (3,810/103)	3,769 (3,702/67)	23,166 (22,434/732)
Sri Lanka	54 (49/5)	39 (27/12)	47 (43/4)	16 (14/2)	42 (35/7)	42 (32/10)	73 (65/8)	302 (274/28)	835 (782/53)	281 (248/33)	544 (486/58)	1,627 (1,471/156)	3,174 (2,807/367)	4,410 (3,903/507)	6,146 (5,228/918)	17,632 (15,464/2,168)
South Korea	550 (492/58)	508 (448/60)	520 (441/79)	301 (253/48)	153 (136/17)	150 (124/26)	219 (195/24)	720 (676/44)	1,838 (1,737/101)	2,967 (2,837/130)	2,068 (1,960/108)	1,884 (1,758/126)	1,618 (1,510/108)	1,229 (1,124/105)	883 (783/100)	15,608 (14,474/1,134)
Serbia	164 (143/21)	188 (162/26)	274 (239/35)	613 (518/95)	650 (599/51)	804 (705/99)	878 (804/74)	930 (867/63)	911 (841/70)	811 (747/64)	946 (833/113)	1,311 (1,199/112)	884 (821/63)	852 (807/45)	477 (446/31)	10,693 (9,731/962)
Kosovo	46 (46/0)	24 (21/3)	3 (3/0)	40 (40/0)	24 (23/1)	88 (82/6)	640 (571/69)	522 (490/32)	740 (680/60)	1,045 (940/105)	1,812 (1,656/156)	1,730 (1,600/130)	725 (667/58)	129 (117/12)	71 (64/7)	7,639 (7,000/639)
Ethiopia	10 (7/3)	14 (4/10)	4 (1/3)	2 (2/0)	1 (1/0)	0	17 (15/2)	328 (224/104)	505 (348/157)	1,033 (812/221)	2,168 (1,716/452)	535 (425/110)	431 (330/101)	398 (290/108)	256 (193/63)	5,702 (4,368/1,334)
Armenia	457 (251/206)	457 (259/198)	448 (271/177)	363 (215/148)	140 (95/45)	156 (117/39)	181 (136/45)	281 (210/71)	433 (328/105)	332 (244/88)	948 (706/242)	368 (291/77)	119 (88/31)	106 (89/17)	61 (44/17)	4,850 (3,344/1,506)
Others	3,740 (2,882/858)	4,288 (3,344/944)	3,780 (2,801/979)	3,336 (2,474/862)	3,154 (2,397/757)	3,356 (2,574/782)	3,737 (2,826/911)	4,946 (3,843/1,103)	7,630 (5,748/1,882)	7,819 (6,030/1,789)	12,682 (9,499/3,183)9,499	20,567 (15,822/4,745)	21,021 (16,151/4,870)	23,334 (17,899/5,435)	24,030 (18,114/5,916)	147,420 (112,404/35,016)
Europe	22,471 (14,230/8,241)	24,269 (14,979/9,290)	24,395 (14,487/9,908)	30,683 (19,373/11,310)	55,411 (39,323/16,088)	115,985 (84,011/31,974)	210,091 (152,596/57,495)	267,462 (199,366/68,096)	370,857 (270,245/100,612)	335,939 (238,377/97,562)	378,409 (274,151/104,258)	111,956 (83,944/28,012)	18,889 (13,435/5,454)	12,130 (8,697/3,433)	8,507 (6,001/2,506)	1,987,454 (1,433,215/554,239)
South Asia	3,182 (2,818/364)	2,230 (2,003/227)	2,436 (2,185/251)	2,239 (2,017/222)	2,588 (2,319/269)	3,956 (3,560/396)	13,949 (12,607/1,342)	38,037 (35,083/2,954)	26,023 (24,057/1,966)	18,787 (17,371/1,416)	35,947 (33,335/2,612)	81,652 (76,967/4,685)	119,986 (112,514/7,472)	96,080 (89,357/6,723)	67,399 (62,202/5,197)	514,491 (478,395/36,096)
North Africa and Western/Central Asia	3,491 (3,075/416)	3,742 (3,280/462)	3,653 (3,138/515)	3,459 (2,945/514)	3,047 (2,666/381)	2,846 (2,530/316)	6,188 (5,438/750)	14,010 (12,689/1,321)	26,512 (23,701/2,811)	26,580 (23,385/3,195)	50,882 (45,245/5,637)	109,255 (99,684/9,571)	95,664 (86,691/8,973)	86,054 (76,251/9,803)	56,911 (50,519/6,392)	492,294 (441,237/51,057)
East and South-East Asia	10,400 (7,215/3,185)	7,607 (5,054/2,553)	7,226 (4,639/2,587)	6,017 (3,995/2,022)	3,496 (2,409/1,087)	3,169 (2,217/952)	3,840 (2,547/1,293)	6,842 (4,958/1,884)	17,207 (12,384/4,823)	19,901 (14,571/5,330)	29,422 (19,943/9,479)	43,939 (28,054/15,885)	54,867 (35,519/19,348)	66,267 (45,492/20,775)	53,164 (36,125/17,039)	333,364 (225,122/108,242)
Americas	903 (709/194)	966 (726/240)	1,036 (786/250)	991 (733/258)	1,017 (731/286)	1,113 (842/271)	1,219 (908/311)	1,533 (1,165/368)	2,111 (1,696/415)	1,976 (1,513/463)	2,682 (2,005/677)	8,551 (6,468/2,083)	17,061 (12,938/4,123)	44,670 (32,719/11,951)	47,142 (33,426/13,716)	132,971 (97,365/35,606)
Sub-Saharan Africa	309 (258/51)	268 (209/59)	268 (204/64)	220 (177/43)	177 (128/49)	273 (214/59)	290 (218/72)	820 (605/215)	1,962 (1,410/552)	3,306 (2,463/843)	7,782 (5,716/2,066)	10,062 (7,544/2,518)	14,093 (11,483/2,610)	17,678 (14,410/3,268)	18,343 (15,189/3,154)	75,851 (60,228/15,623)
Oceania	48 (37/11)	53 (36/17)	42 (29/13)	40 (28/12)	45 (36/9)	47 (36/11)	45 (33/12)	62 (39/23)	62 (45/17)	39 (35/4)	59 (57/2)	59 (51/8)	58 (44/14)	60 (42/18)	51 (39/12)	770 (587/183)
Total	41,265 (28,597/12,668)	39,601 (26,555/13,046)	39,526 (25,759/13,767)	44,026 (29,497/14,529)	65,926 (47,711/18,215)	127,550 (93,530/34,020)	235,807 (174,487/61,320)	329,049 (254,117/74,932)	445,171 (333,974/111,302)	406,828 (297,938/108,890)	506,137 (381,161/124,976)	365,858 (303,016/62,842)	320,749 (272,724/48,025)	322,941 (266,970/55,971)	251,525 (203,509/48,016)	3,541,792 (2,739,256/802,536)

==== Declarations of entrusting work to a foreigner ====
In addition to work permits, there is a secondary, easier work migration scheme called declarations of entrusting work to a foreigner. Compared to the work permit system, employers seeking to entrust work to a foreigner do not need to subject the job to a labor market test. However, the work visa is only valid for up to 24 months instead of 36 months. Prior to 2022, the time limits were even stricter, with a 6-month maximum stay that had to be accompanied by a 6-month period outside of Poland until a new work visa could be obtained. This system is only open to citizens of 5 post-Soviet countries, though business leaders have called for an extension to other post-Soviet republics. Russian citizens are excluded from the program since October 2022, following the invasion of Ukraine. Between 2007 and 2017, this scheme was known as a declaration of intention to entrust work to a foreigner, though it led to numerous abuses, since after submitting the statement, employers were not obliged to report whether the foreigner had come, and whether they had taken the job. Migrants would sometimes take up different work than previously indicated, use the permit to move to Western Europe, or not arrive at all. On 1 January 2018, it was replaced by the current scheme. Since then, employers are obliged to report the fact that the migrant has taken up employment. The change limits the comparability of the data from the previous periods.

Registered declarations of entrusting work to a foreigner
Country	2018	2019	2020	2021	2022
Ukraine	1,446,304	1,475,923	1,329,491	1,705,709	618,503
Belarus	62,805	66,045	78,905	103,749	217,374
Georgia	28,008	45,137	44,270	135,743	147,847
Moldova	36,742	39,414	45,281	76,506	47,269
Russia	6,718	11,262	19,246	36,214	16,084
Armenia	1,648	2,302	2,406	7,314	7,475
Total	1,582,225	1,640,083	1,519,599	2,065,416	1,054,640

==== Seasonal work permits ====
Since January 2018, employers may hire foreigners on a seasonal work permit, used specifically for agricultural and tourism-related work. In 2020, 60.8% of hired foreigners were women, 42% were under 35 years old, and most worked in Poland from 31 to 90 days. The vast majority of migrants come from Ukraine, as well as Belarus, Moldova, and Georgia, since the law doesn't require the employer to look for potential Polish workers before hiring a foreigner from said countries.

Seasonal work permits by country of citizenship
Country	2018	2019	2020
Ukraine	119,926	129,683	135,482
Belarus	607	659	625
Moldova	359	380	342
Georgia	199	302	291
Uzbekistan	3	66	122
Philippines	15	78	78
Russia	45	79	62
Indonesia	0	3	44
Others	35	97	175
Total	121,436	131,446	137,403

==== Social insurance data ====
Polish social insurance provider, Zakład Ubezpieczeń Społecznych (ZUS), reported 1,094,148 foreigners paying towards pension insurance in Poland at the end of June 2023, an 8.1% increase since the year prior and more than double compared to 5 years ago. Foreigners were 6.74% of all insured in Poland, an increase from basically 0 just a few years earlier. Ukrainians and Belarusians were the largest groups of foreigners, at 68.4% and 11.1%, respectively. Other nationalities with more than 10,000 people insured in the Polish insurance system include: Georgians (27,434), Indians (18,620), Moldovans (14,654), and Russians (12,709).

=== Ukrainian refugees ===
Poland has been at the forefront of the Ukrainian refugee crisis from the very beginning, as the country shares a long border with Ukraine and many Ukrainians have family members working or studying in Poland. As the refugee crisis became apparent, Polish authorities waived certain entry restrictions for people fleeing Ukraine, such as requirements for passports and, along with millions of private citizens, organized food and shelter for the arriving refugees. Poland's response to the Ukrainian refugee crisis has won the country international praise.

As of September 2023, 958,120 refugees remain in Poland, of which 408,884 are under 18. More than 1 in 10 refugees lives in Warsaw (103,476), followed by Wrocław (45,942), Kraków (31,795) and Poznań (24,312). Refugees are not counted towards the official population number by GUS as they are in a temporary residence status and temporary residents are not reported.

== Ethnic groups ==
Poland was a diverse country before World War II, with only around 2/3 of the population being ethnically Polish. Due to German and Soviet war-time resettlements and genocides, and after-war population transfers, post-war Poland was one of the most ethnically homogenous countries in Europe and has stayed that way in the 21st century.

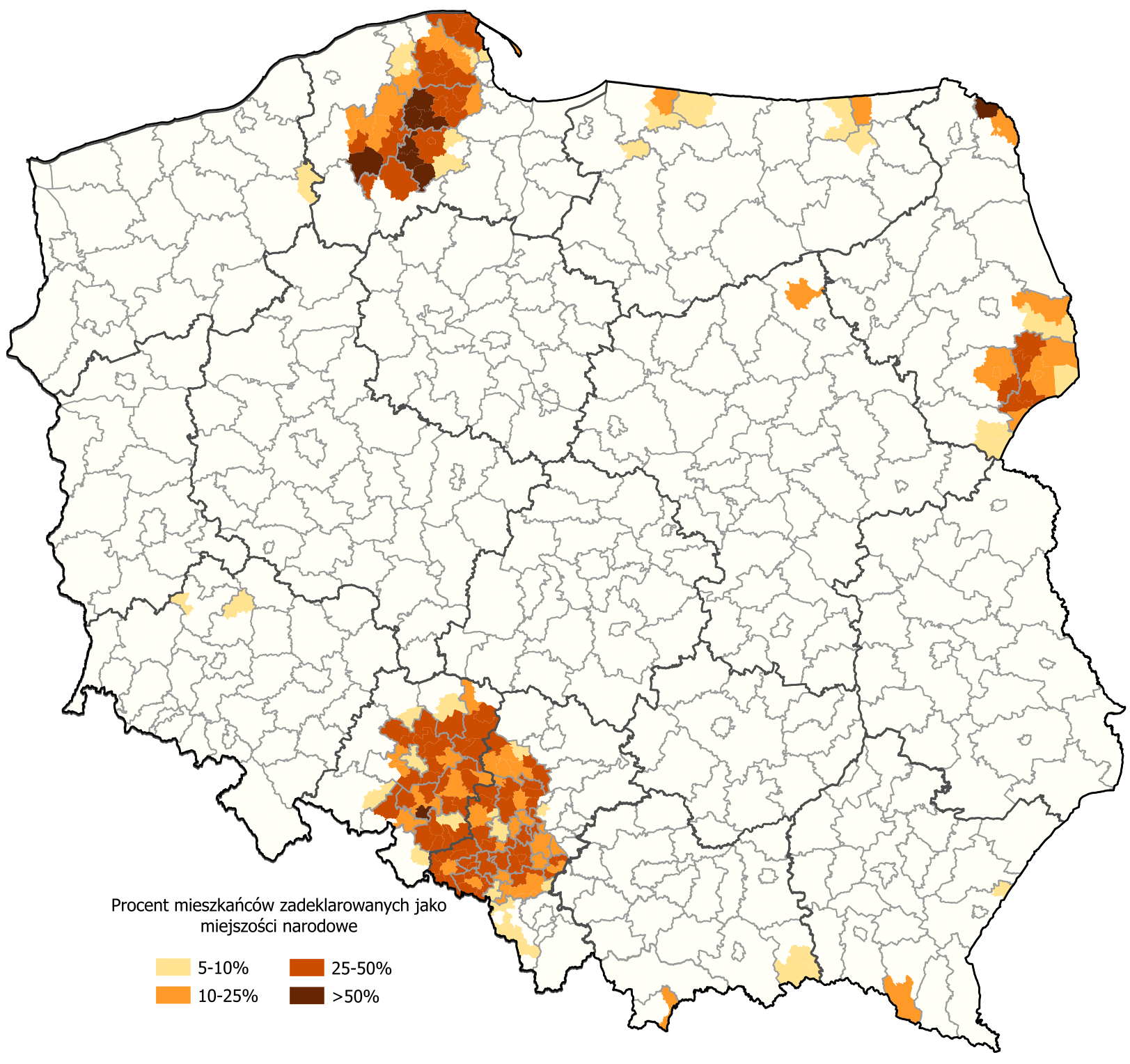
Map of at least 5% non-Polish areas

Population background	%^{1}	Population (1st declaration)	Population (any declaration)
Total	100.00	38,036,118	38,036,118
European Union	99.53	37,858,105	38,690,651
Autochthonous to Poland	99.34	37,785,173	38,423,818
Poles	98.59	37,499,700	37,595,069
Silesians	0.62	236,588	596,224
Kashubians	0.04	15,177	179,685
Lemkos	0.02	9,226	13,607
Romani	0.02	9,026	13,303
Jews	0.02	8,064	17,156
Tatars	0.01	4,009	5,295
Karaites	0.01	3,383	3,479
Other EU member states (primarily Germans)	0.19	72,932	266,833
Other Europe (primarily Ukrainian and Belarusian)	0.34	130,903	232,165
Other (primarily Vietnamese)	0.08	30,051	102,746
Unspecified	0.03	11,128	11,128
^{1} In the 2021 census responders were allowed to pick up to 2 nationalities/ethnicities. Percentages are calculated for the first choice only.

National and ethnic composition of Poland by census
Ethnicity	1921		1931		1946		2002		2011^{1}		2021^{1}	
Ethnicity	Number	%	Number	%	Number	%	Number	%	Number	%	Number	%
Poles	17,789,287	69.23	21,993,444	68.91	20,520,178	85.75	36,983,720	96.74	37,310,300	96.88	37,499,700	98.59
Silesians							173,153	0.45	435,800	1.13	236,588	0.62
Ukrainians	3,898,428	15.17	3,221,975	10.10			30,957	0.08	38,400	0.10	64,909	0.17
Belarusians	1,035,693	4.03	989,852	3.10			48,737	0.13	36,400	0.09	43,693	0.11
Germans	769,392	2.99	740,992	2.32	2,288,300	9.56	152,897	0.40	74,500	0.19	42,558	0.11
Kashubians							5,062	0.01	17,700	0.05	15,177	0.04
Russians	48,920	0.19	138,713	0.43			6,103	0.02	8,200	0.02	10,977	0.03
Lemkos							5,863	0.02	7,100	0.02	9,226	0.02
Romani							12,855	0.03	12,600	0.03	9,026	0.02
Lithuanians	24,044	0.09	83,116	0.26			5,846	0.02	5,600	0.01	8,088	0.02
Jews	2,048,878	7.97	2,732,573	8.56			1,133	0.00	2,500	0.01	8,064	0.02
Armenians							1,082	0.00	3,000	0.01	5,586	0.01
Slovaks							2,001	0.01	2,300	0.01	4,508	0.01
Vietnamese							1,808	0.00	3,600	0.01	4,198	0.01
Czechs	30,628	0.12	38,097	0.12			831	0.00	1,300	0.00	4,035	0.01
Ruthenians			1,219,647	3.82								
Local	38,943	0.15	707,088	2.22								
Others	9,856	0.04	11,119	0.03	399,526	1.67					69,785	0.18
Unknown	631	0.00	39,163	0.12	417,431	.	774,885	2.03	521,500	1.35	11,128	0.03
Total	25,694,700		31,915,779		23,929,757		38,230,080		38,511,824		38,036,100	
^{1} In 2011 and 2021 censuses responders were allowed to pick up to 2 nationalities/ethnicities. Only first choices are shown here.

A breakdown of ethnic Poles and ethnic minorities by voivodeship according to the censuses of 2002, 2011 and 2021:

Census year	2002 census			2011 census			2021 census		
Voivodeship	Polish ethnicity	Non-Polish ethnicity	Not reported or no ethnicity	Polish ethnicity (including mixed)	Only non-Polish ethnicity	Not reported or no ethnicity	Polish ethnicity (including mixed)	Only non-Polish ethnicity	Not reported or no ethnicity
Lower Silesian	98.02%	0.42%	1.56%	97.87%	0.38%	1.75%	99.25%	0.72%	0.03%
Greater Poland	99.29%	0.13%	0.58%	98.96%	0.13%	0.91%	99.60%	0.38%	0.02%
Holy Cross	98.50%	0.09%	1.41%	98.82%	0.08%	1.10%	99.70%	0.27%	0.03%
Kuyavian-Pomeranian	98.74%	0.13%	1.13%	98.73%	0.12%	1.15%	99.63%	0.34%	0.03%
Lesser Poland	98.72%	0.26%	1.02%	98.22%	0.24%	1.54%	99.50%	0.47%	0.03%
Lublin	98.74%	0.13%	1.12%	98.66%	0.14%	1.20%	99.64%	0.33%	0.03%
Lubusz	97.72%	0.33%	1.95%	98.26%	0.31%	1.43%	99.43%	0.54%	0.03%
Łódź	98.06%	0.15%	1.78%	98.86%	0.16%	0.98%	99.61%	0.37%	0.02%
Masovian	96.55%	0.26%	3.19%	98.61%	0.37%	1.02%	99.29%	0.68%	0.03%
Opole	81.62%	12.52%	5.86%	88.14%	9.72%	2.14%	95.58%	4.33%	0.09%
Podlaskie	93.94%	4.57%	1.49%	95.18%	2.89%	1.93%	98.17%	1.79%	0.04%
Pomeranian	97.42%	0.58%	2.00%	97.68%	0.95%	1.37%	98.97%	1.01%	0.02%
Silesian	91.99%	3.93%	4.08%	90.65%	7.78%	1.57%	95.49%	4.48%	0.03%
Subcarpathian	98.83%	0.26%	0.91%	98.16%	0.21%	1.63%	99.60%	0.36%	0.04%
Warmian-Masurian	97.13%	1.28%	1.60%	97.59%	0.90%	1.51%	99.21%	0.76%	0.03%
West Pomeranian	98.27%	0.46%	1.27%	98.18%	0.36%	1.46%	99.39%	0.58%	0.03%
Poland	96.74%	1.23%	2.03%	97.10%	1.55%	1.35%	98.84%	1.13%	0.03%

== Languages ==
Polish 97.8%, other and unspecified 2.2% (2002 census)

== Religion ==
Historically, Poland has been a religiously diverse country. However, after the war-related population transfers and the Holocaust, Poland became predominantly Catholic, with small Orthodox, Protestant and Jewish communities.

Religious makeup of Poland in 2021
1. Roman Catholic (71.3%)
2. Orthodox (0.40%)
3. Jehovah's Witnesses (0.29%)
4. Other denominations (0.58%)
5. No denomination (6.87%)
6. Refused to state (20.5%)
7. Unknown (0.04%)

The most recent census has shown a Catholic majority again, however with a significant drop in self-declared Catholics compared to a census 10 years earlier. Roman Catholics constitute 71.3% of the population, down from 87.58% in 2011.

	Percentage of population		Number of adherents	
Denomination	2011 census	2021 census	2011 census	2021 census
Roman Catholic Church	87.6	71.3	33,728,734	27,121,331
Polish Orthodox Church	0.4	0.4	156,284	151,648
Jehovah's Witnessess	0.4	0.29	137,308	108,754
Lutheranism	0.2	0.17	70,766	65,407
Greek Catholic Church	0.1	0.09	33,281	33,209
Pentecostal Church	0.1	0.08	26,433	30,105
Catholic Mariavite Church	0.0	0.03	9,990	12,248
Old Catholic Church of Poland	0.0	0.02	8,807	6,942
Baptist Christian Church of the Republic of Poland	0.0	0.01	5,982	5,181
Buddhism	0.0	0.01	5,981	3,236
Seventh Day Adventist Church	0.0	0.01	4,947	3,129
Pastafarianism	0.0	0.01	492	2,312
Islam	0.0	0.01	5,108	2,209
Christ's Church in Poland	0.0	0.01	860	2,072
Slavic Native Faiths	0.0	0.01	914	2,039
God's Church in Christ	0.0	0.01	1,350	2,007
Other denominations	0.1	0.11	24,716	40,343
Not belonging to any denomination	2.4	6.87	929,420	2,611,506
Refusing to state a denomination	7.1	20.53	2,733,843	7,807,553
Denomination unknown	1.6	0.04	626,608	16,059

== See also ==
- Health in Poland
- Polish diaspora
- Statistics Poland
