= Health in Poland =

== Health status ==
=== Life expectancy at birth ===
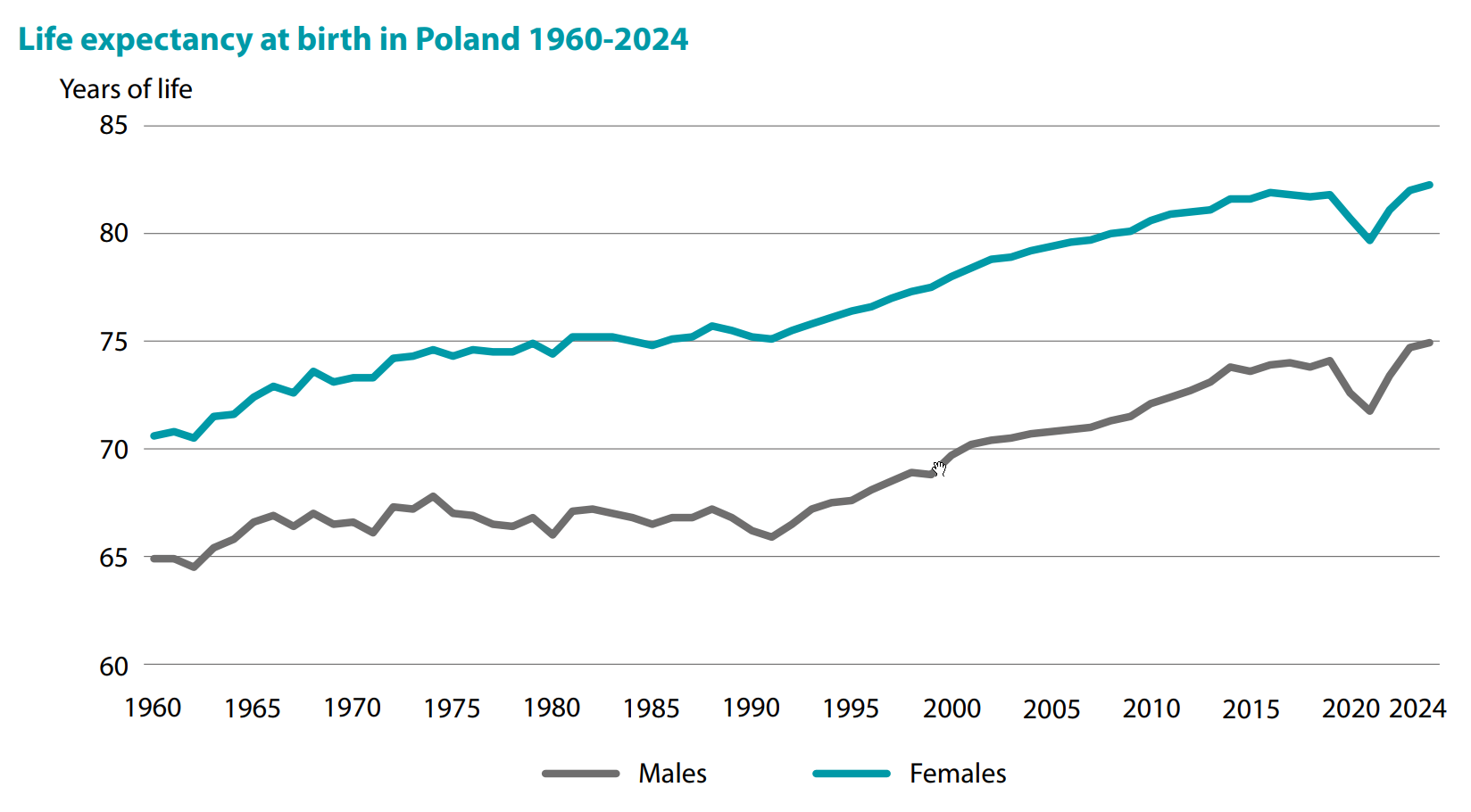
Life expectancy at birth in Poland, 1960–2024

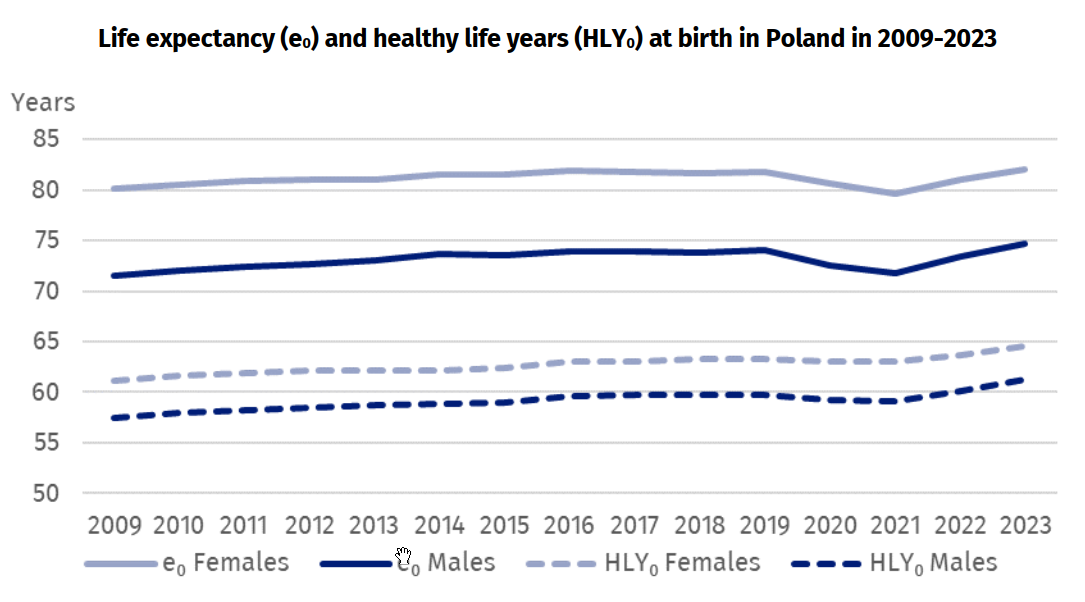
Life expectancy and healthy life years at birth in Poland, 2009–2023

As of 2024, life expectancy at birth in Poland was 78.49 years, 74.93 for male and 82.26 for female, ranking it 25th in the EU region, according to Eurostat data for 2023.

As a result of the COVID-19 pandemic, life expectancy at birth decreased significantly in 2020 and 2021. Compared to pre-pandemic levels in 2019, in 2021 it was 2.3 years lower for males and 2.1 years lower for females. This trend was reversed in 2022, although life expectancy at birth in 2022 was still 0.7 years lower than in 2019.

Overall, the life expectancy in Poland has increased in the last three decades of modern Polish history since the fall of communism in 1989 and the subsequent democratic transition that ended the Polish People's Republic and culminated in democratic consolidation.

=== Mortality rates ===
In 2022, mortality rate in Poland was 937 people per 100,000 of the population, up from 869 people per 100,000 of the population in 2019 due to the COVID-19 pandemic deaths.

==== Causes of death ====
In Poland, the main established causes of deaths are cardiovascular diseases, neoplasms (cancer), and respiratory diseases.

In 2021, they were responsible for almost 60% of all deaths:

- Cardiovascular diseases: almost 35% of all deaths; 359 per 100,000 persons,
- Neoplasms: almost 20% of all deaths; 217 per 100,000 persons,
- Respiratory diseases: 5.4% of all deaths; 58 per 100,000 persons.

A further 4.2% of all deaths, or 52 per 100,000 persons, were due to external causes, mainly accidents and injuries. This is the most common cause of death for men under 45, accounting for nearly 31% of all deaths in this demographic group. This is also five times more than for women in the same age group.

In 2021, another nearly 18% of all deaths, or 193 per 100,000 persons, were caused by the COVID-19, with over 89% of these deaths among people aged 60 years or older.

Oral Health

Oral health conditions are categorized mainly into five groups: dental caries (tooth decay), periodontal disease, edentulism(tooth loss), lip and oral cavity cancers, and other related pathologies.

Oral Disease Burden in Poland	Estimated Prevalence Rates 2019:
Untreated caries of deciduous teeth in children 1–9 years	46%
Untreated caries of permanent teeth in people 5+ years	29.80%
Periodontal disease in people >15 years	22.20%
Edentulism in people >20 years old	11.90%

As of 2020, the incidence rate of lip and oral cavity cancers was 6 per 100,000

Similarly to other non-communicable diseases, oral disease risk factors are modifiable, such as tobacco use, alcohol use, high sugar intake, poor hygiene, and underlying social and commercial determinants.

== Risk factors ==
Polish population health status and health inequalities combine with many health determinants, including living and working conditions, environmental health, and behavioral risk factors.

=== Behavioral risk factors ===
The National Health Situation Report 2016 points smoking, alcohol abuse and overweight/obesity as the main factors contributing to years of life lost in the disability-adjusted life year scale:

- smoking takes away 18.6 years of life from men and 7.9 years of life from women;
- alcohol abuse is responsible for the loss of 9.5 years of lives for men and 1.7 years of lives for women. Average alcohol consumption is 10.7 liters per person/year, which is slightly higher than the European average of 10.2 liters
- overweight and obesity are responsible for 9.6 years lost in general. The problem of overweight and obesity exists among 62 – 68% of men and 46 – 60% of women

==== Smoking ====
The legal age for buying tobacco or alcohol is 18.

Smoking itself causes the loss of 13.1% of lives, where behavioral factors take away 36% of lives.

A blanket ban on smoking in public places was introduced on 15 November 2010, with a penalty fine of up to 500 złoty. Smoking is effectively banned on public transport, transport stops and stations, schools and universities, workplaces, sports arenas, and other public places. Owners of pubs, restaurants, and other public spots are obliged to place a visible ‘No Smoking’ sign.

Smoking rooms, called ‘palarnia’ in Polish, are permitted, but it is not permitted to serve food in them. Municipalities may extend the ban to places such as parks and bus stops.

==== Alcohol consumption ====
The average consumption of alcohol in 2015 was 19.8 liters per year for men and 5.8 liters per year for women. Beer is consumed much more than wine.

==== Obesity ====
Overweight and obesity indicate abnormal or excessive fat growth that presents an upcoming future health risk. A rough measure of obesity among the population is the body mass index (BMI), a person's weight (in kilograms) divided by the square of height (in meters). A person with a BMI of 30 or more is generally considered obese. A person who has a BMI of 25 or above 25 is deemed to be overweight. Overweight and obesity are major risk factors for many chronic diseases, including diabetes, cardiovascular diseases, and cancer. Once considered a problem only in high-income countries, overweight and obesity are now dramatically rising in low- and middle-income countries, particularly in urban settings.

In 2016, female obesity prevalence in Poland was 22.2%, while male obesity prevalence reached 23.7%.

- From 1997 to 2016, the female 18+ obesity prevalence in Poland increased extensively from 18.1 to 22.2%.
- The male 18+ obesity prevalence in Poland between 1997 and 2016 increased from 14.8% to 23.7%, increasing at an average annual rate of 2.51%.

== Health system ==
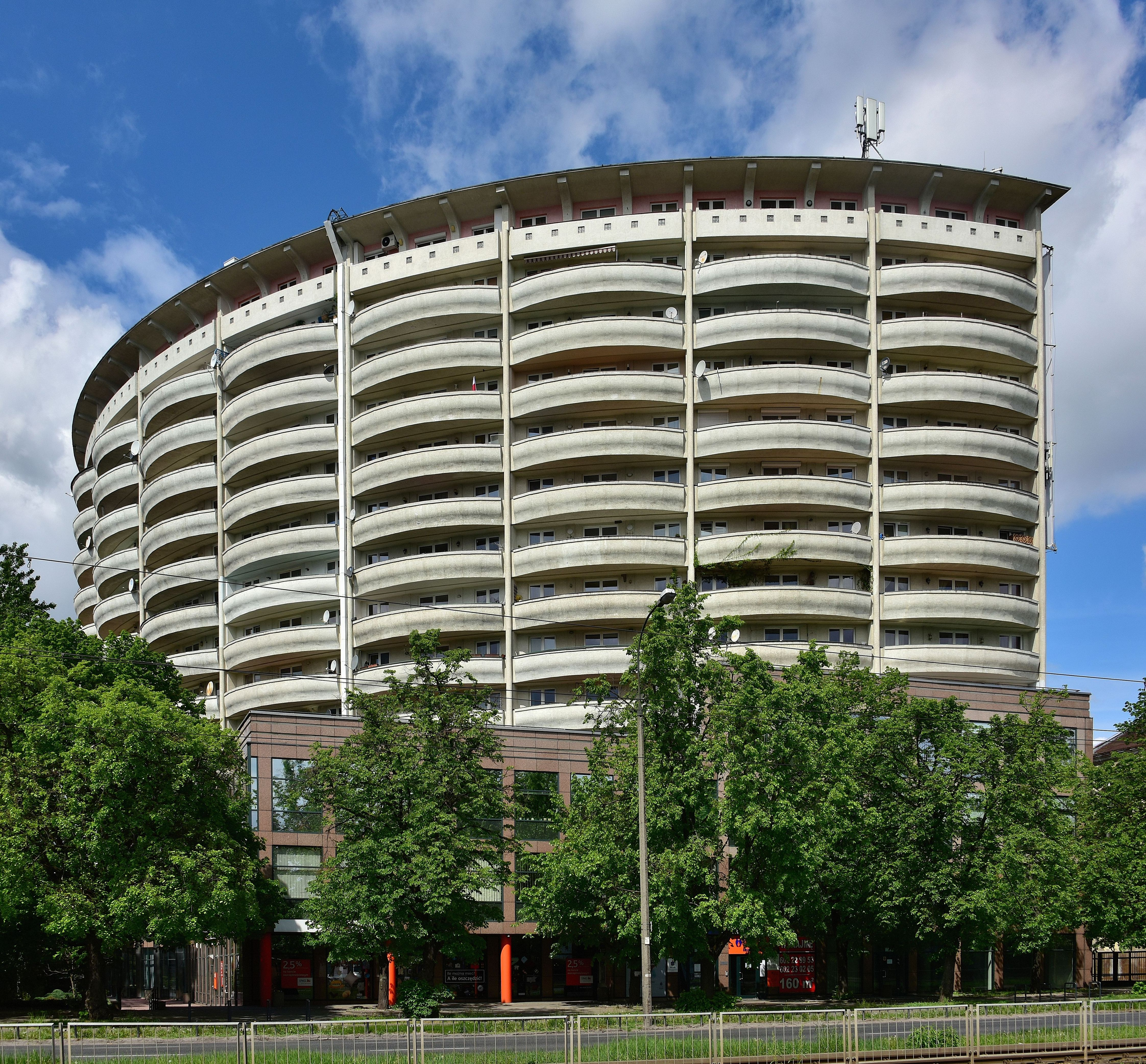
The Narodowy Fundusz Zdrowia (NFZ) is the national health insurer of Poland.

Poland operates a publicly funded universal health care system based on compulsory insurance model in which all people insured in Poland, EU and EFTA countries, as well as citizens of select other countries, have the right to access public healthcare, guaranteed by the Polish constitution, and organized by the National Health Fund (Polish: Narodowy Fundusz Zdrowia; NFZ). The health insurance contribution currently amounts to 9% of individual income. These deductions are the primary source of funding for public and universal health insurance.

As of 2022, Poland's total health expenditure, in both the public and private sectors, amounted to 6.7% of GDP, compared to 9.2% on average in the OECD, with the absolute per-capita amount increasing by over 33% since 2019.

Enrollment in private health insurance schemes is an increasingly popular practice in Poland, further popularized in recent years by the COVID-19 pandemic. By the end of the third quarter of 2023, 4.69 million people in Poland had private health insurance, up 15% year-on-year, with a total capitalization of 1.1745 billion PLN ($279 million), up nearly 34% year-on-year. In total, Polish people pay nearly 10 billion PLN ($2.38 billion) a year on private healthcare, according to a report by INFARMA, an association of pharmaceutical companies.
