= Okulinka =

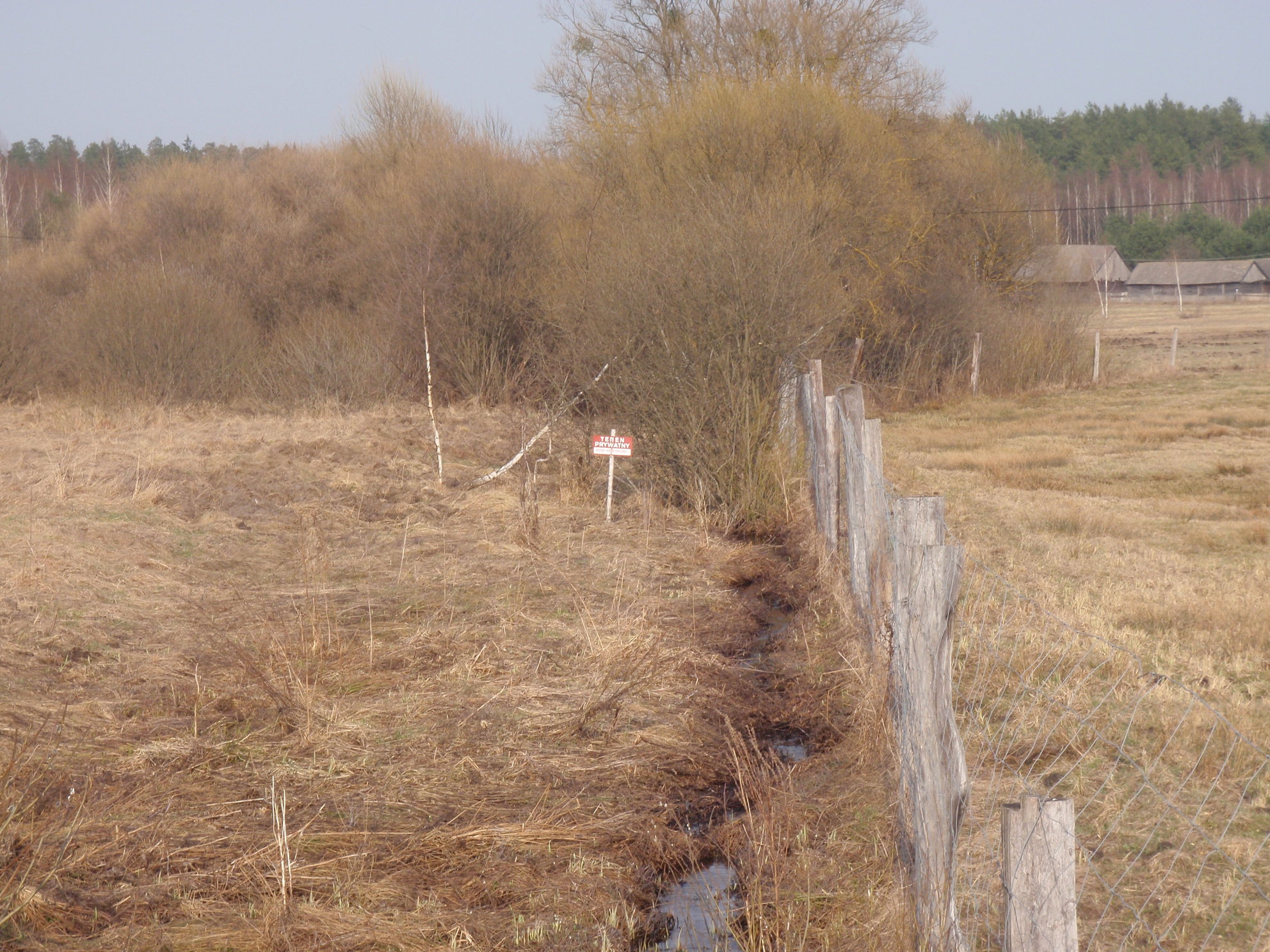

- Map of the streams and river of Białowieża Forest, the Okulinka in light blue

Location
- Country: Poland
- Voivodeship: Podlaskie
- County (Powiat): Hajnówka
- Gmina: Gmina Narewka

Physical characteristics
- Source
  - location: Skupowo
  - coordinates: 52°49′55.5″N 23°41′44.5″E
  - elevation: 163 m (535 ft)
- Mouth: Narewka
  - location: north of Podlewkowie
  - coordinates: 52°52′34″N 23°42′23″E
  - elevation: 139.5 m (458 ft)
- Length: 6 km (3.7 mi)
- Basin size: 12.22 km^{2} (4.72 mi^{2})

Basin features
- Progression: Narewka→ Narew→ Vistula→ Baltic Sea

Okulinka is a small river of Poland, a left tributary of the Narewka at Podlewkowie.
