= Czeremcha-Wieś =

- Village
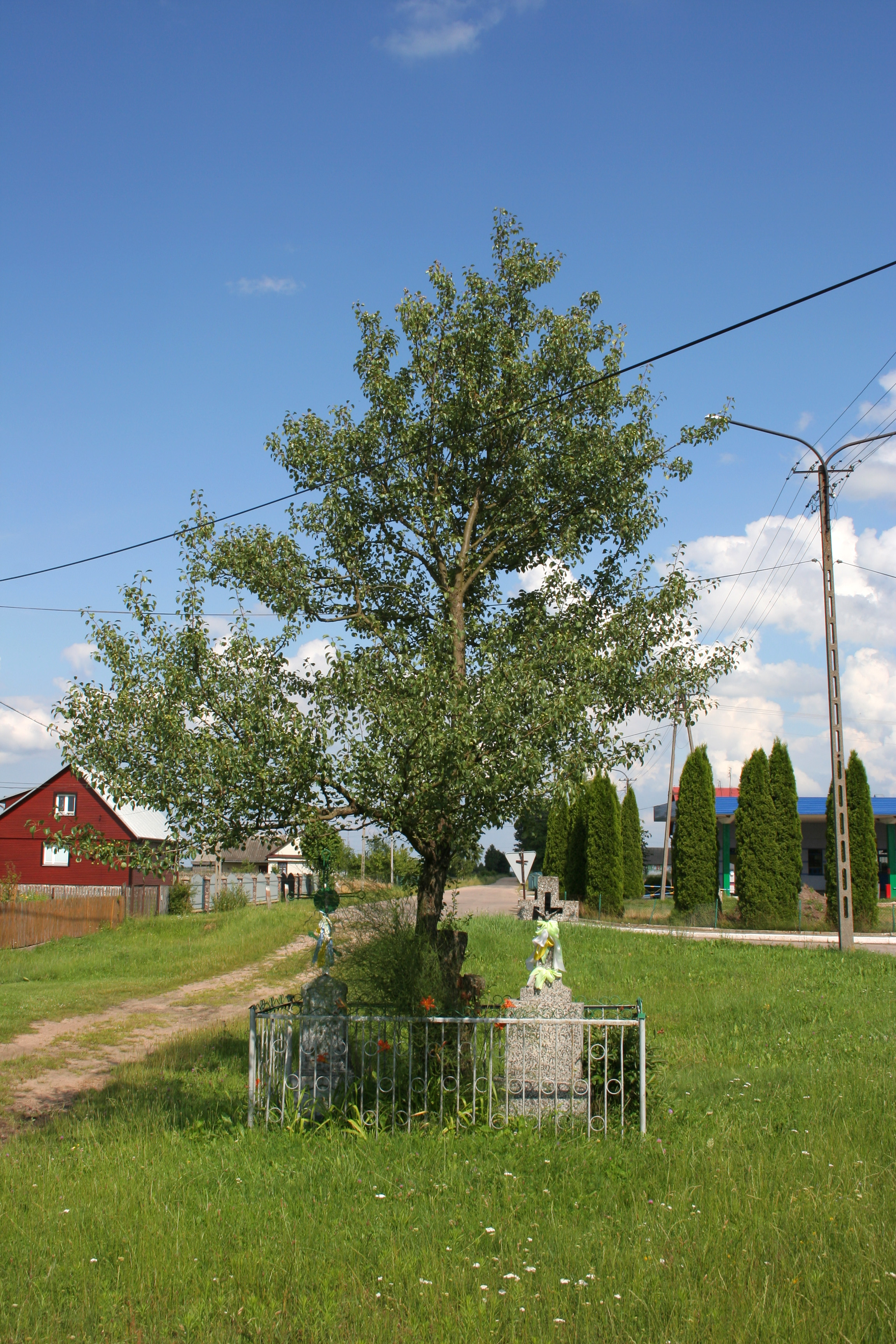
- Cross by the roadside of Czeremcha-Wieś

- Location within Poland
- Coordinates: 52°31′30″N 23°20′30″E
- Country: Poland
- Voivodeship: Podlaskie
- County: Hajnówka
- Gmina: Czeremcha

Czeremcha-Wieś [t͡ʂɛˈrɛmxa ˈvjɛɕ] is a village in the administrative district of Gmina Czeremcha, within Hajnówka County, Podlaskie Voivodeship, in north-eastern Poland, close to the border with Belarus.
