= Świnoroje =

- Village
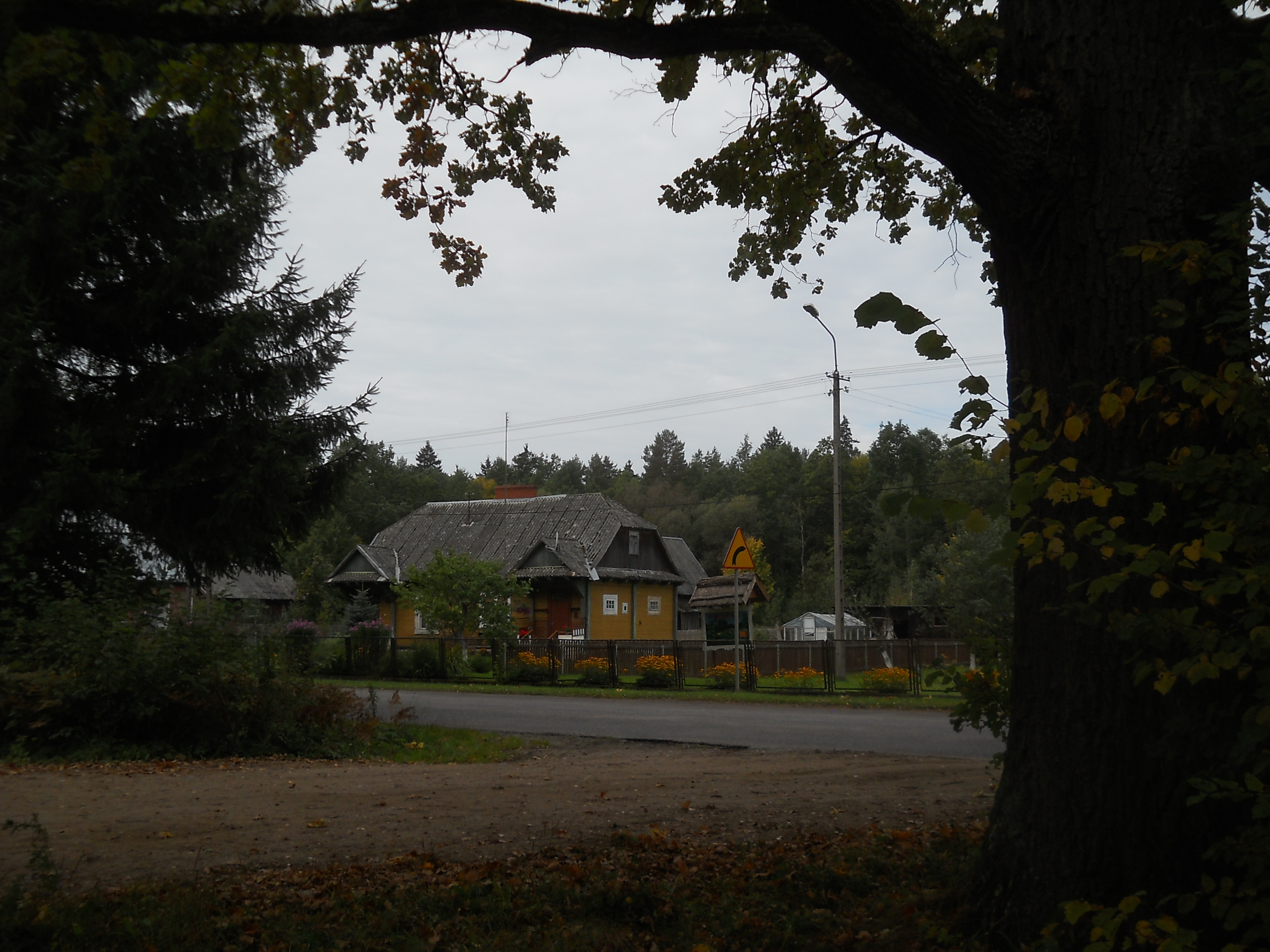

- Location within Poland
- Coordinates: 52°49′37″N 23°44′14″E
- Country: Poland
- Voivodeship: Podlaskie
- County: Hajnówka
- Gmina: Narewka

Świnoroje [ɕfinɔˈrɔjɛ] is a village in the administrative district of Gmina Narewka, within Hajnówka County, Podlaskie Voivodeship, in north-eastern Poland, close to the border with Belarus.
