= Kapitańszczyzna =

- Village
- Location within Poland
- Coordinates: 52°53′3″N 23°40′5″E
- Country: Poland
- Voivodeship: Podlaskie
- County: Hajnówka
- Gmina: Narewka
- Population: 100

Kapitańszczyzna [kapitaɲʂˈt͡ʂɨzna] is a village in the administrative district of Gmina Narewka, within Hajnówka County, Podlaskie Voivodeship, in north-eastern Poland, close to the border with Belarus.
