= Olchówka, Podlaskie Voivodeship =

Olchówka
- Village
- Location within Poland
- Coordinates: 52°51′20″N 23°49′35″E
- Country: Poland
- Voivodeship: Podlaskie
- County: Hajnówka
- Gmina: Narewka
- Population: 210

Olchówka [ɔlˈxufka] is a village in the administrative district of Gmina Narewka, within Hajnówka County, Podlaskie Voivodeship, in north-eastern Poland, close to the border with Belarus.
