= Dąbrowa, Gmina Narewka =

Dąbrowa
- Village
- Location within Poland
- Coordinates: 52°54′01″N 23°42′47″E
- Country: Poland
- Voivodeship: Podlaskie
- County: Hajnówka
- Gmina: Narewka

Dąbrowa [dɔmˈbrɔva] is a village in the administrative district of Gmina Narewka, within Hajnówka County, Podlaskie Voivodeship, in north-eastern Poland, close to the border with Belarus.
