= Stare Lewkowo =

- Village
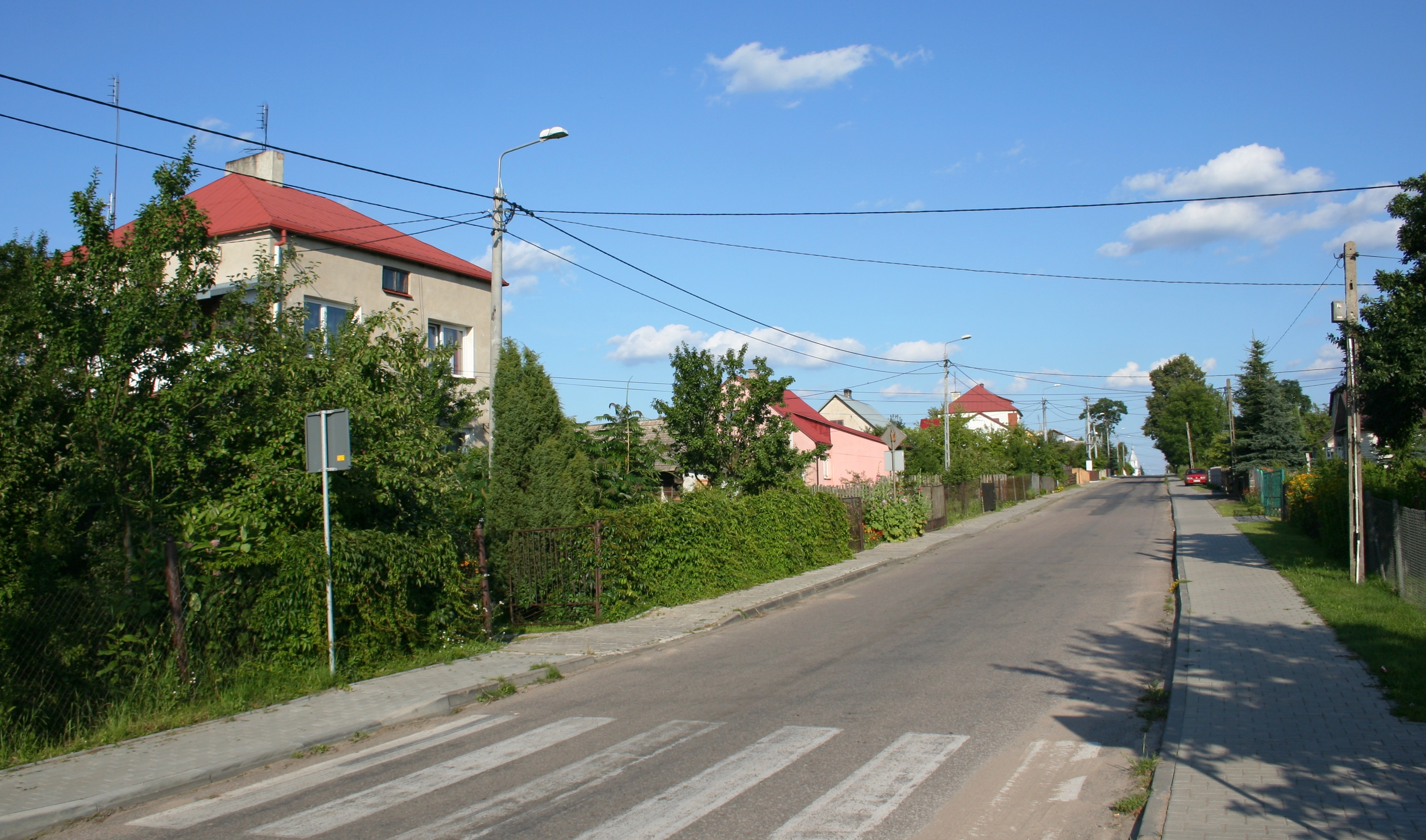
- Stare Lewkowo, July 2009

- Location within Poland
- Coordinates: 52°53′N 23°42′E
- Country: Poland
- Voivodeship: Podlaskie
- County: Hajnówka
- Gmina: Narewka
- Population: 450
- Area code: (+48) 85
- Vehicle registration: BHA
- Website: www.wlewkowo.republika.pl

Stare Lewkowo [ˈstarɛ lɛfˈkɔvɔ] is a village in the administrative district of Gmina Narewka, within Hajnówka County, Podlaskie Voivodeship, in north-eastern Poland, close to the border with Belarus, on the river Narewka.
