= Zabłotczyzna =

- Village
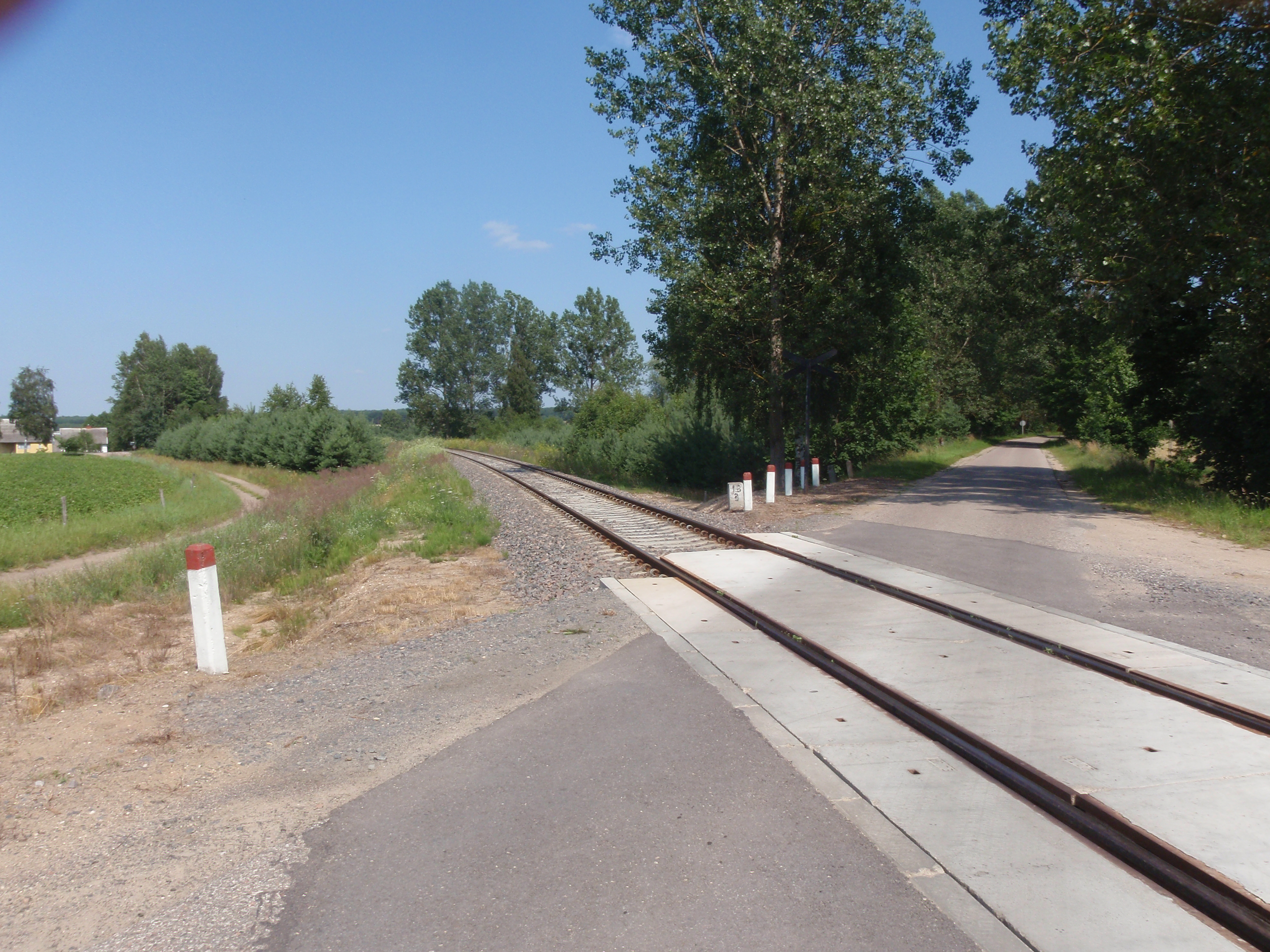

- Location within Poland
- Coordinates: 52°51′N 23°45′E
- Country: Poland
- Voivodeship: Podlaskie
- County: Hajnówka
- Gmina: Narewka
- Population: 110

Zabłotczyzna [zabwɔtˈt͡ʂɨzna] is a village in the administrative district of Gmina Narewka, within Hajnówka County, Podlaskie Voivodeship, in north-eastern Poland, close to the border with Belarus.
