= Zamosze =

- Settlement
- Location within Poland
- Coordinates: 52°48′54″N 23°54′46″E
- Country: Poland
- Voivodeship: Podlaskie
- County: Hajnówka
- Gmina: Narewka

Zamosze [zaˈmɔʂɛ] is a settlement in the administrative district of Gmina Narewka, within Hajnówka County, Podlaskie Voivodeship, in north-eastern Poland, close to the border with Belarus.
