= Łuka, Podlaskie Voivodeship =

Łuka
- Village
- Location within Poland
- Coordinates: 52°56′5″N 23°46′5″E
- Country: Poland
- Voivodeship: Podlaskie
- County: Hajnówka
- Gmina: Narewka
- Established: 1632
- Population: 50

Łuka [ˈwuka] is a village in the administrative district of Gmina Narewka, within Hajnówka County, Podlaskie Voivodeship, in north-eastern Poland, close to the border with Belarus.

== History ==
The village was established in 1632. Originally, a large part of Łuka was located on a slight hill stretching along the Narew River and gently sloping towards it. Currently, there is only one house left in Łuka, formerly belonging to Sergiusz Łobacz, which after renovation retained its original interior and serves its former inhabitants as a stop on their sentimental journeys.
