= Pohulanka, Podlaskie Voivodeship =

Pohulanka
- Settlement
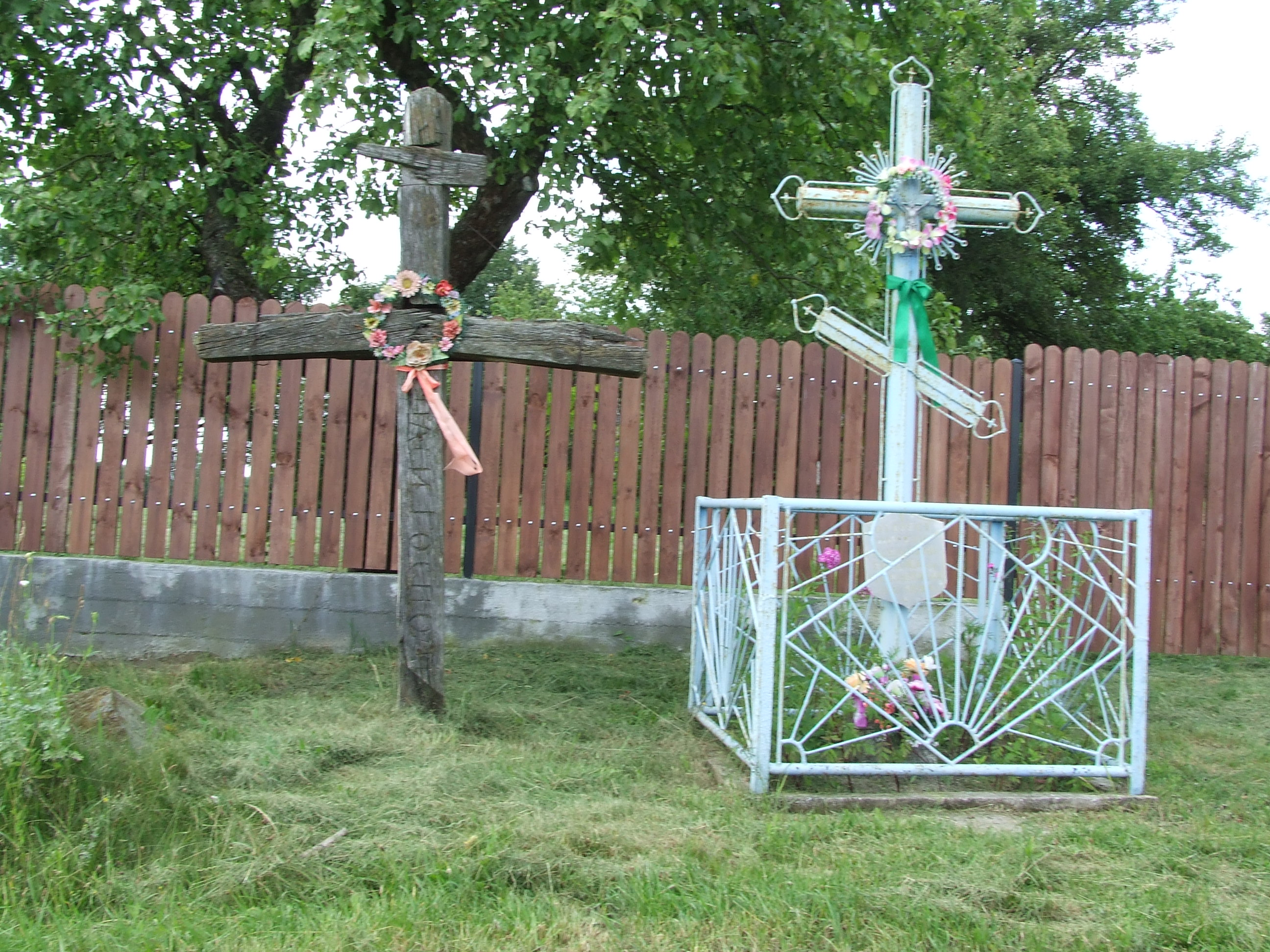
- Cross in Pohulanka

- Location within Poland
- Coordinates: 52°28′19″N 23°16′59″E
- Country: Poland
- Voivodeship: Podlaskie
- County: Hajnówka
- Gmina: Czeremcha

Pohulanka [pɔxuˈlaŋka] is a settlement in the administrative district of Gmina Czeremcha, within Hajnówka County, Podlaskie Voivodeship, in north-eastern Poland, close to the border with Belarus.
