= Kruhlik =

- Village
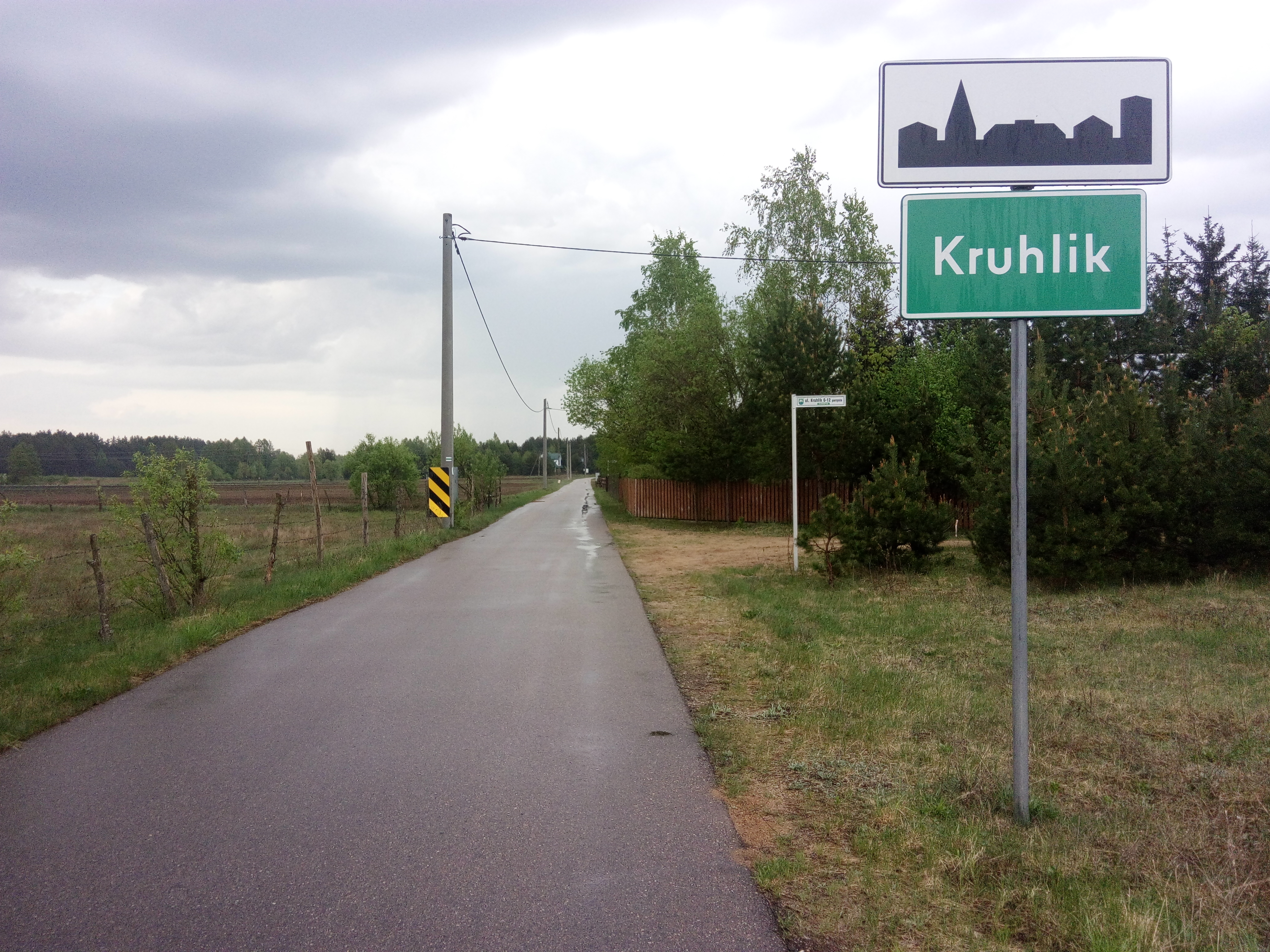
- Road sign in Kruhlik

- Location within Poland
- Coordinates: 52°53′56″N 23°53′50″E
- Country: Poland
- Voivodeship: Podlaskie
- County: Hajnówka
- Gmina: Narewka

Kruhlik [ˈkruxlik] is a village in the administrative district of Gmina Narewka, within Hajnówka County, Podlaskie Voivodeship, in north-eastern Poland, close to the border with Belarus.
