= Lozove (village) =

Lozove is an urban-type settlement in Khmelnytskyi Oblast, Ukraine.

Lozove may also refer to:

- Lozove, Bakhmut Raion, a village in Donetsk Oblast, Ukraine
- Lozove, Kherson Oblast, Kherson Oblast, Ukraine
- Lozove, Starobilsk Raion, a village in Luhansk Oblast, Ukraine
- Lozove, Yasynuvata Raion, a rural settlement in Donetsk Oblast, Ukraine

== See also ==
- Łozowe
