= Osyp =

Osyp or Osip may refer to:

== People ==
- Osip, masculine given name
- Shabdar Osyp (1898–1937), Soviet author

== Places ==
- Osyp, Poland, a village in Podlaskie Voivodeship, Poland
