= Stawiszcze, Gmina Czeremcha =

Stawiszcze
- Village
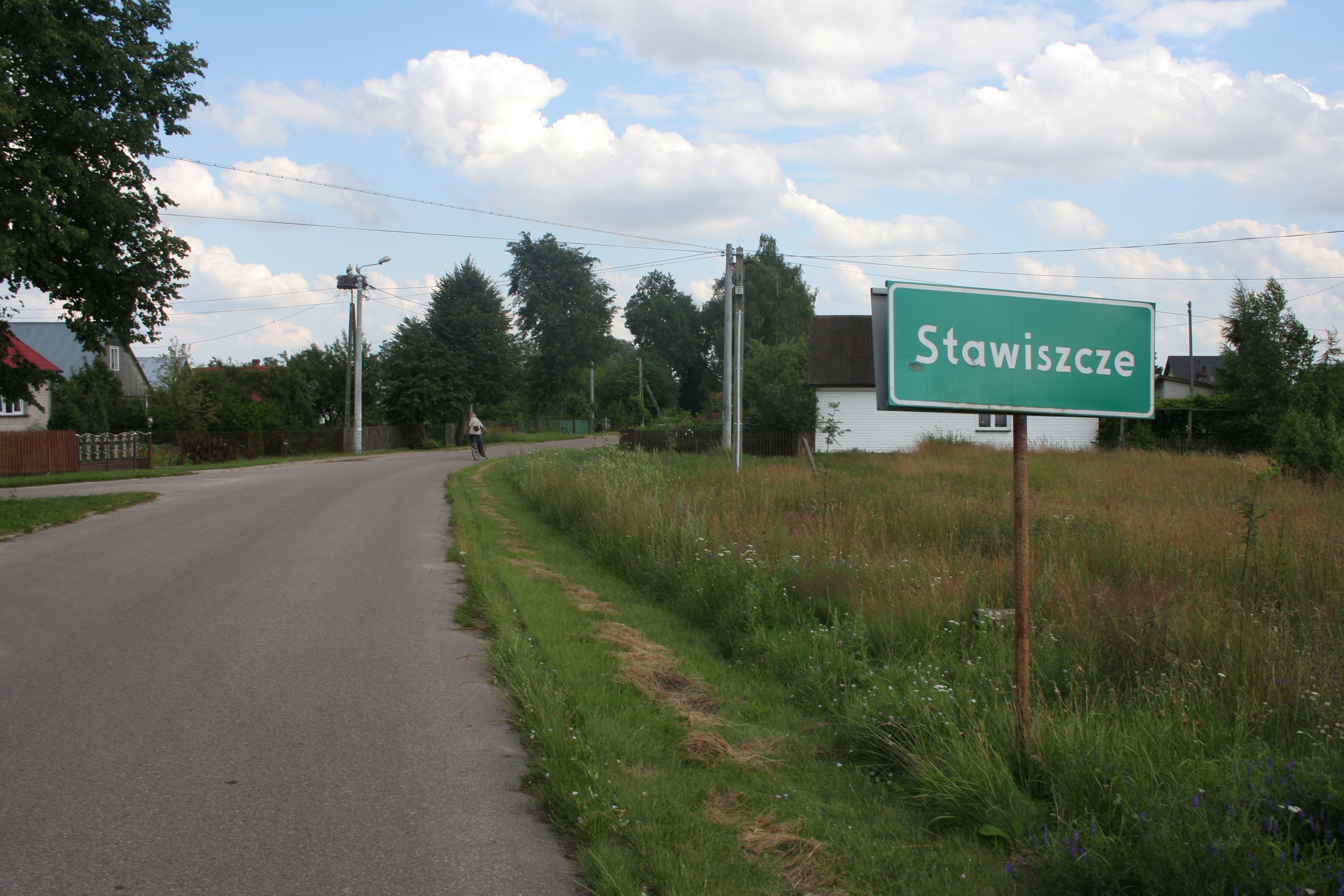
- Entrance to the village

- Location within Poland
- Coordinates: 52°30′N 23°22′E
- Country: Poland
- Voivodeship: Podlaskie
- County: Hajnówka
- Gmina: Czeremcha
- Time zone: UTC+1 (CET)
  - Summer (DST): UTC+2 (CEST)
- Vehicle registration: BHA

Stawiszcze [staˈviʂt͡ʂɛ] is a village in the administrative district of Gmina Czeremcha, within Hajnówka County, Podlaskie Voivodeship, in north-eastern Poland, close to the border with Belarus.
