= Stary Dwór, Podlaskie Voivodeship =

Stary Dwór
- Village
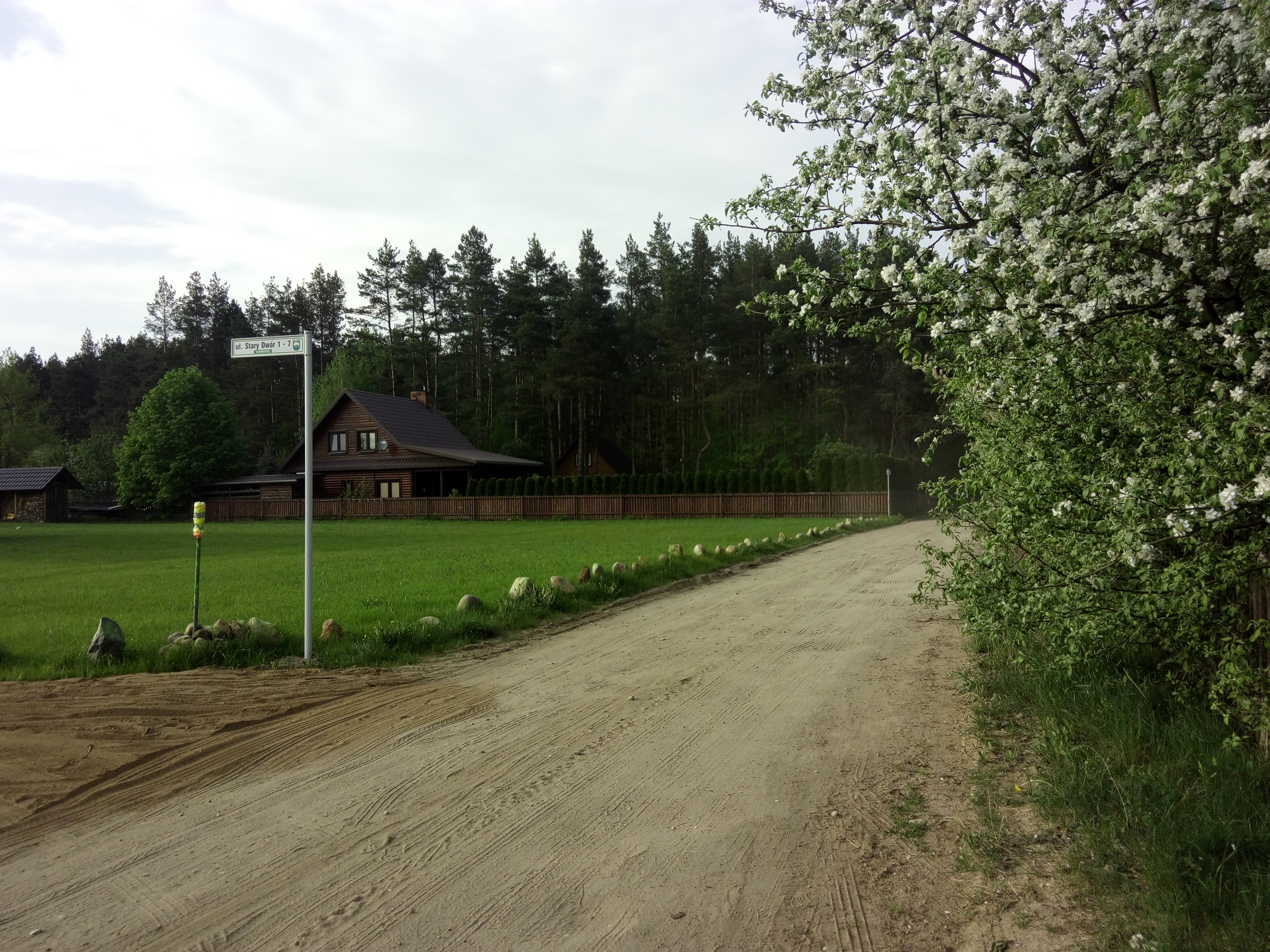
- Forest house in Stary Dwór

- Location within Poland
- Coordinates: 52°53′26″N 23°53′00″E
- Country: Poland
- Voivodeship: Podlaskie
- County: Hajnówka
- Gmina: Narewka

Stary Dwór [ˈstarɨ ˈdvur] is a village in the administrative district of Gmina Narewka, within Hajnówka County, Podlaskie Voivodeship, in north-eastern Poland, close to the border with Belarus.
