= Ludwinowo, Hajnówka County =

Ludwinowo
- Village
- Location within Poland
- Coordinates: 52°55′7″N 23°46′0″E
- Country: Poland
- Voivodeship: Podlaskie
- County: Hajnówka
- Gmina: Narewka

Ludwinowo [ludviˈnɔvɔ] is a village in the administrative district of Gmina Narewka, within Hajnówka County, Podlaskie Voivodeship, in north-eastern Poland, close to the border with Belarus.

== Name ==
Liudvin or Liutvin (Liuduin, Liutwin) is a name of Germanic origin.
