= Gnilec, Podlaskie Voivodeship =

Gnilec
- Settlement
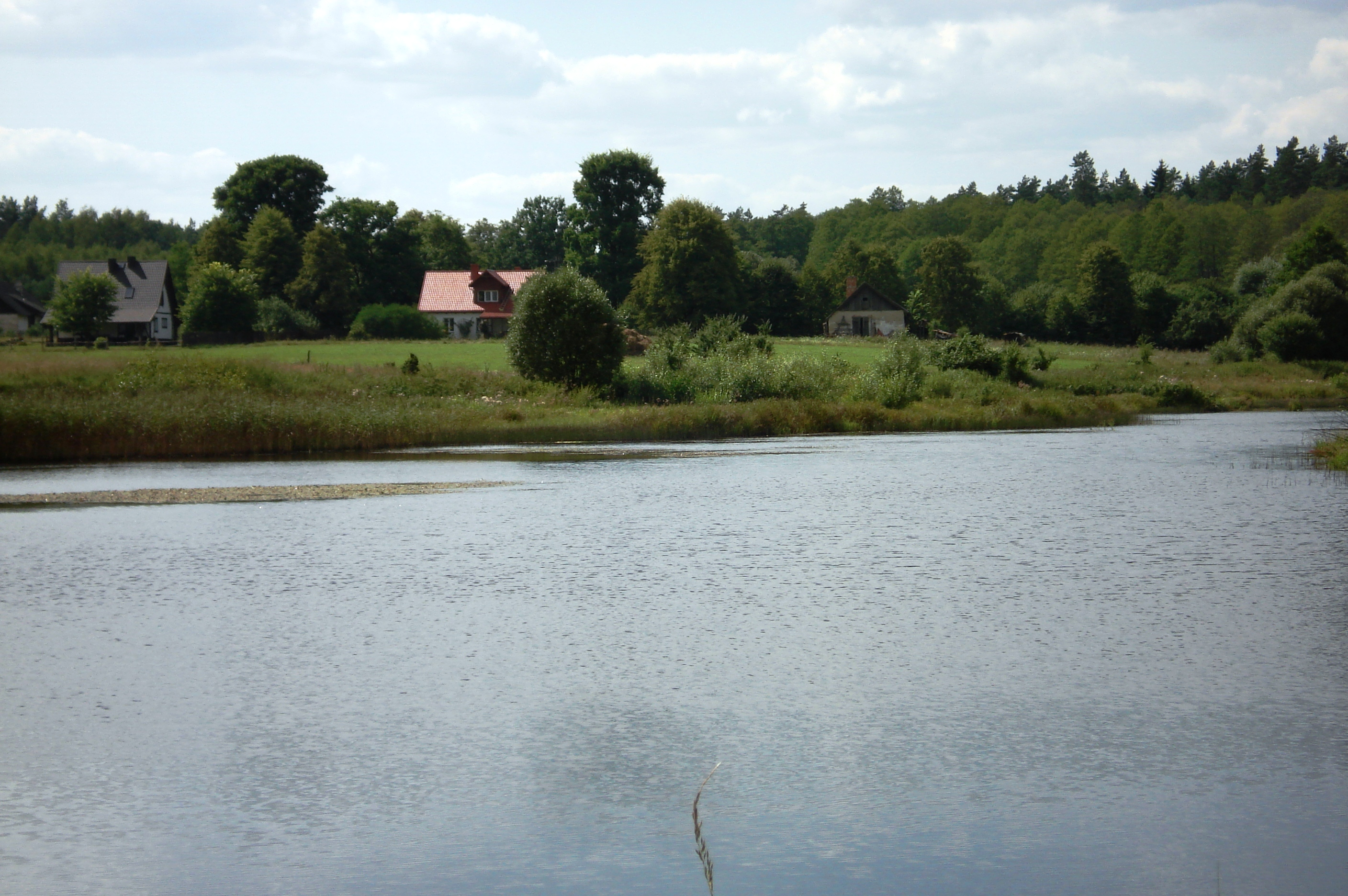

- Location within Poland
- Coordinates: 52°50′36″N 23°39′7″E
- Country: Poland
- Voivodeship: Podlaskie
- County: Hajnówka
- Gmina: Narewka

Gnilec [ˈɡnilɛt͡s] is a settlement in the administrative district of Gmina Narewka, within Hajnówka County, Podlaskie Voivodeship, in north-eastern Poland, close to the border with Belarus.
