= Janowo, Gmina Narewka =

Janowo
- Village
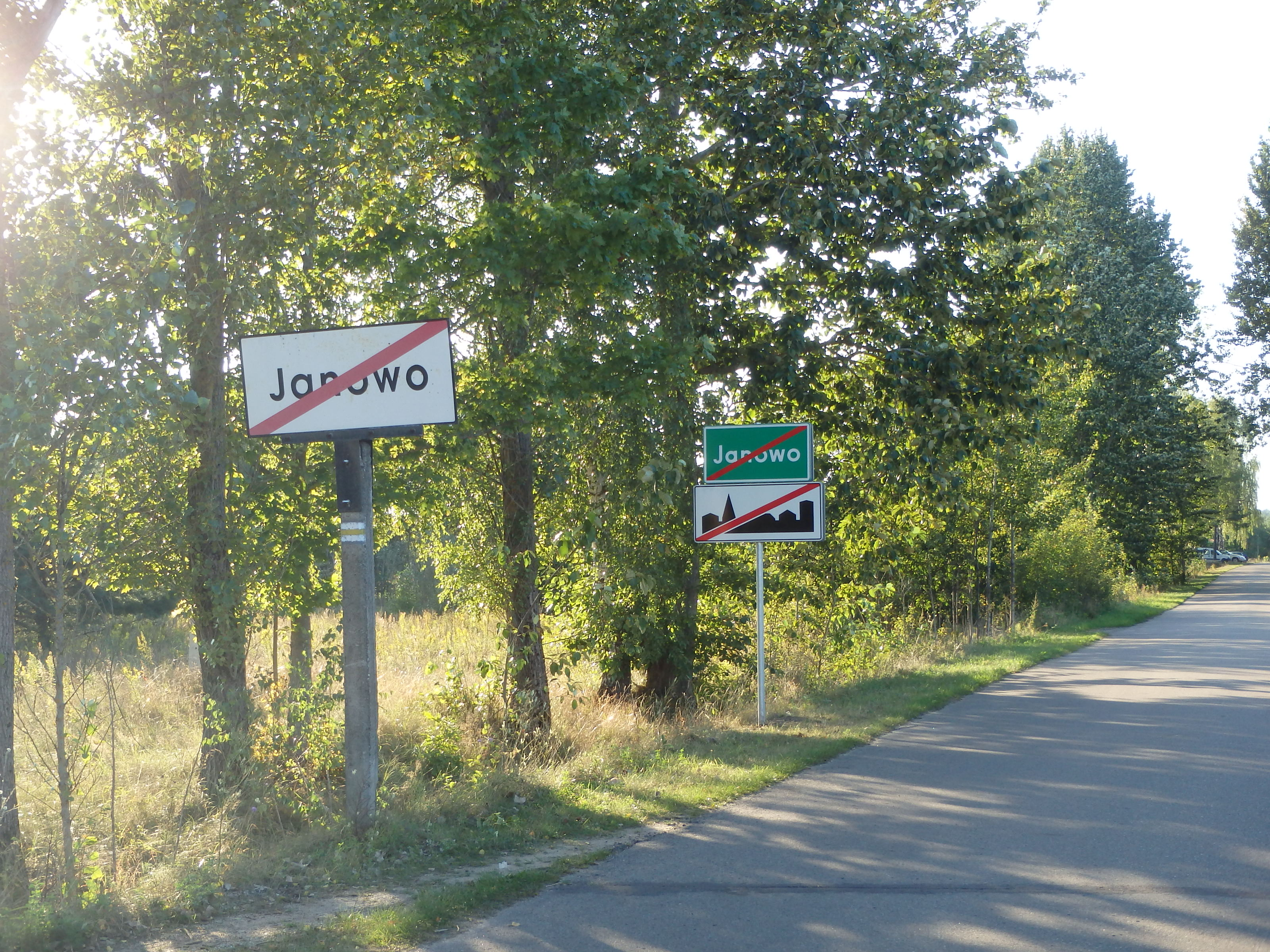
- Road sign in Janowo

- Location within Poland
- Coordinates: 52°49′39″N 23°45′49″E
- Country: Poland
- Voivodeship: Podlaskie
- County: Hajnówka
- Gmina: Narewka

Janowo [jaˈnɔvɔ] is a village in the administrative district of Gmina Narewka, within Hajnówka County, Podlaskie Voivodeship, in north-eastern Poland, close to the border with Belarus.
