= Krynica, Hajnówka County =

Krynica
- Village
- Location within Poland
- Coordinates: 52°51′48″N 23°37′36″E
- Country: Poland
- Voivodeship: Podlaskie
- County: Hajnówka
- Gmina: Narewka

Krynica [krɨˈnit͡sa] is a village in the administrative district of Gmina Narewka, within Hajnówka County, Podlaskie Voivodeship, in north-eastern Poland, close to the border with Belarus.
