= Podorabie =

- Settlement
- Location within Poland
- Coordinates: 52°29′19″N 23°17′59″E
- Country: Poland
- Voivodeship: Podlaskie
- County: Hajnówka
- Gmina: Czeremcha

Podorabie [pɔdɔˈrabjɛ] is a settlement in the administrative district of Gmina Czeremcha, within Hajnówka County, Podlaskie Voivodeship, in north-eastern Poland, close to the border with Belarus.
