= Kordon, Poland =

Kordon
- Village
- Location within Poland
- Coordinates: 52°55′07″N 23°40′06″E
- Country: Poland
- Voivodeship: Podlaskie
- County: Hajnówka
- Gmina: Narewka

Kordon [ˈkɔrdɔn] is a village in the administrative district of Gmina Narewka, within Hajnówka County, Podlaskie Voivodeship, in north-eastern Poland, close to the border with Belarus.
