= Siemieniakowszczyzna =

- Village
- Interactive map of Siemieniakowszczyzna
- Location within Poland
- Coordinates: 52°53′08″N 23°50′51″E
- Country: Poland
- Voivodeship: Podlaskie
- County: Hajnówka
- Gmina: Narewka
- Time zone: UTC+1 (CET)
  - Summer (DST): UTC+2 (CEST)
- Vehicle registration: BHA

Siemieniakowszczyzna [ɕɛmjɛɲakɔfʂˈt͡ʂɨzna] is a village in the administrative district of Gmina Narewka, within Hajnówka County, Podlaskie Voivodeship, in north-eastern Poland, close to the border with Belarus. A place with the longest single-word name in Poland (20 letters).

== History ==
Following the joint German-Soviet invasion of Poland, which started World War II in September 1939, the village was first occupied by the Soviet Union until 1941, and then by Germany until 1944. In September 1941, the Germans expelled the entire population, and then plundered and destroyed the village. During the expulsion, the Poles were subjected to beatings by the Germans. The purpose of the expulsion was to hinder the activities of the resistance movement in the area. After the war the village was rebuilt.

== See also ==
- Sobienie Kiełczewskie Pierwsze
- Przedmieście Szczebrzeszyńskie
