= Maruszka, Podlaskie Voivodeship =

Maruszka
- Village
- Location within Poland
- Coordinates: 52°54′11″N 23°51′46″E
- Country: Poland
- Voivodeship: Podlaskie
- County: Hajnówka
- Gmina: Narewka

Maruszka [maˈruʂka] is a village in the administrative district of Gmina Narewka, within Hajnówka County, Podlaskie Voivodeship, in north-eastern Poland, close to the border with Belarus.
