= Mostki, Podlaskie Voivodeship =

Mostki
- Village
- Location within Poland
- Coordinates: 52°54′55″N 23°47′28″E
- Country: Poland
- Voivodeship: Podlaskie
- County: Hajnówka
- Gmina: Narewka

Mostki [ˈmɔstki] is a village in the administrative district of Gmina Narewka, within Hajnówka County of Podlaskie Voivodeship in north-eastern Poland. This village is close to the border with Belarus.
