= Berezyszcze =

- Village
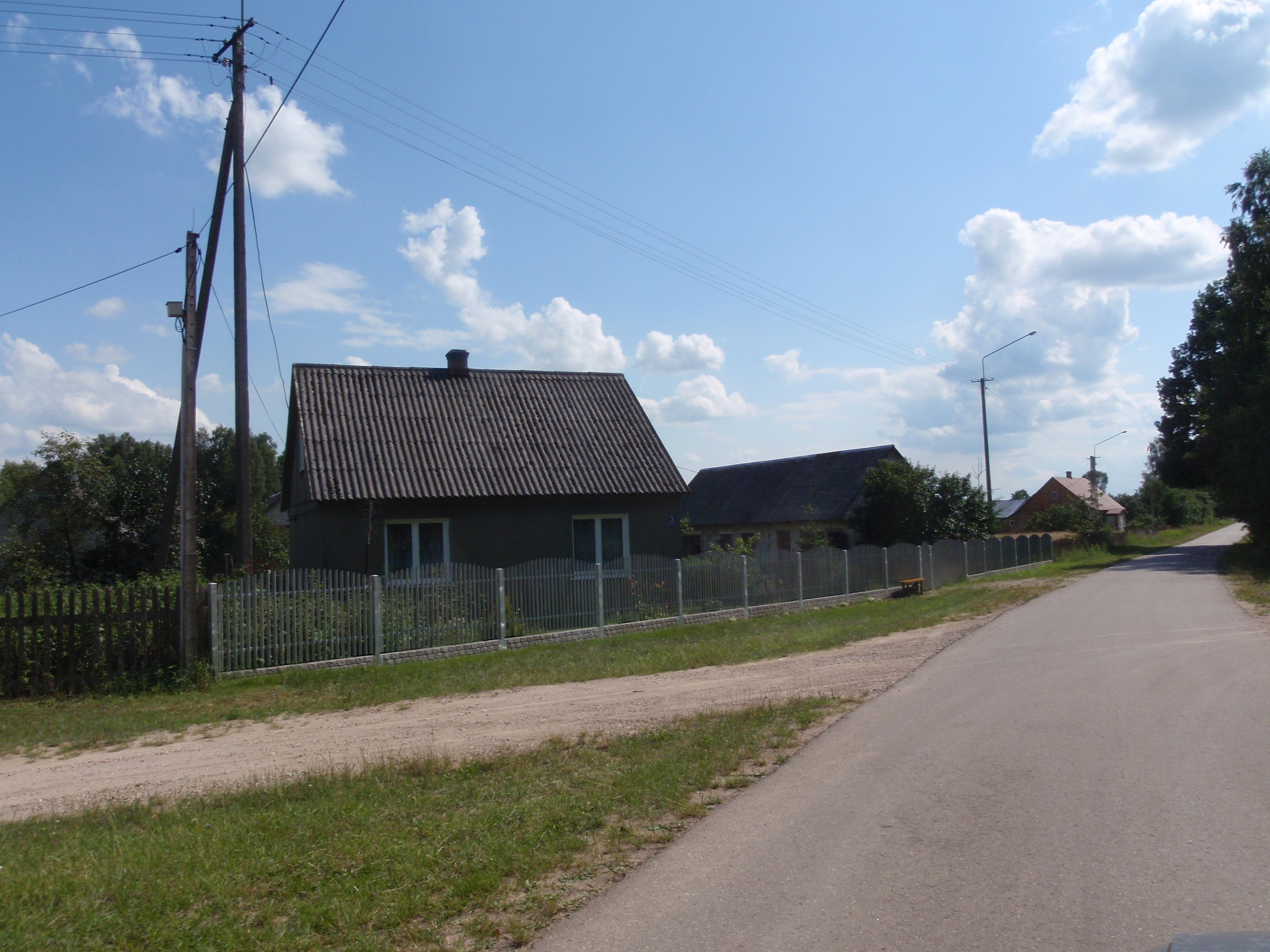

- Location within Poland
- Coordinates: 52°48′N 23°30′E
- Country: Poland
- Voivodeship: Podlaskie
- County: Hajnówka
- Gmina: Czeremcha

Berezyszcze [bɛrɛˈzɨʂt͡ʂɛ] is a village in the administrative district of Gmina Czeremcha, within Hajnówka County, Podlaskie Voivodeship, in north-eastern Poland, close to the border with Belarus.
