= Grodzisk, Hajnówka County =

Grodzisk
- Village
- Location within Poland
- Coordinates: 52°51′N 23°45′E
- Country: Poland
- Voivodeship: Podlaskie
- County: Hajnówka
- Gmina: Narewka

Grodzisk [ˈɡrɔd͡ʑisk] is a village in the administrative district of Gmina Narewka, within Hajnówka County, Podlaskie Voivodeship, in north-eastern Poland, close to the border with Belarus.
