= Zubacze =

- Village
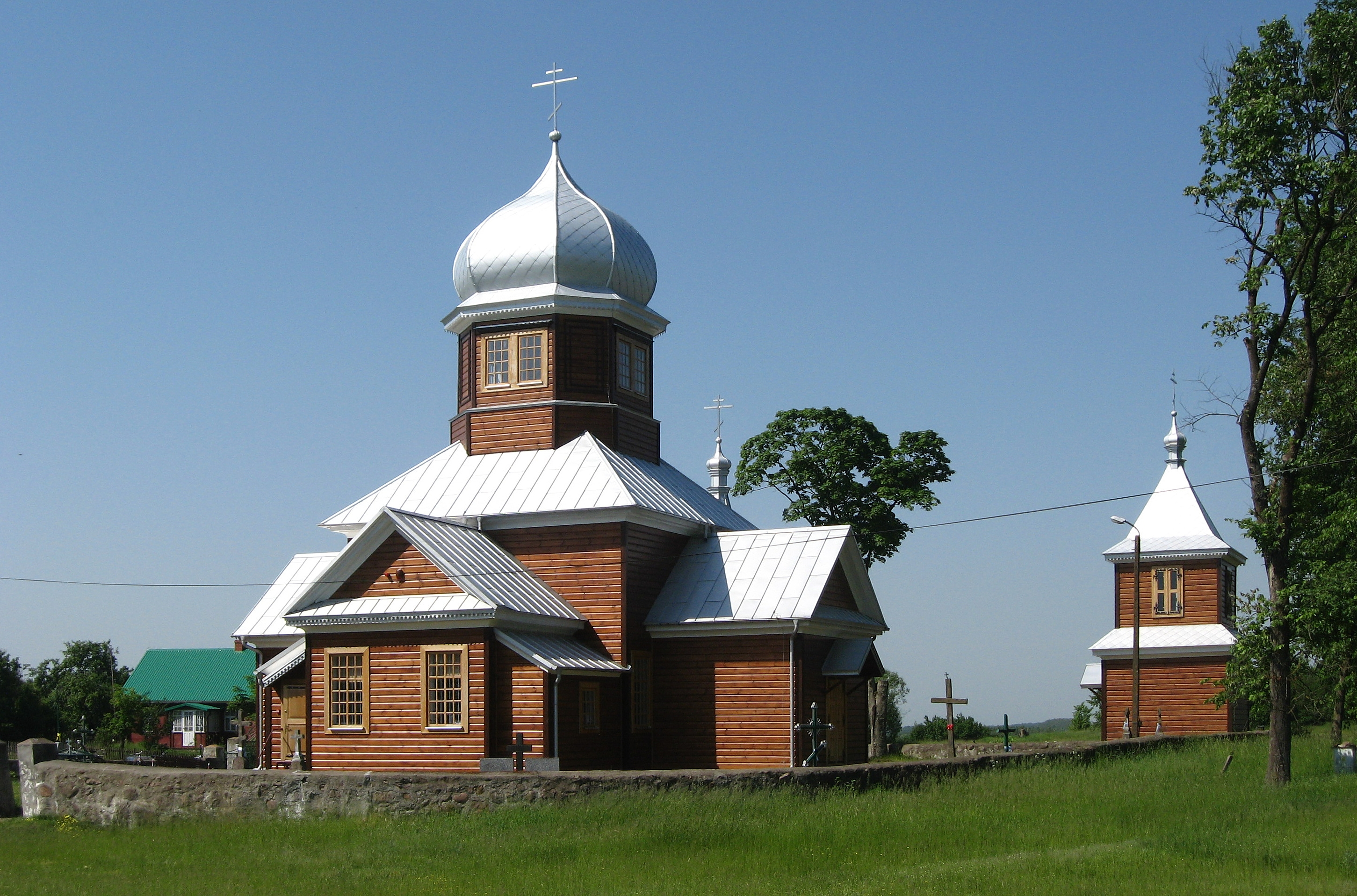
- Orthodox church in Zubacze

- Location within Poland
- Coordinates: 52°27′07″N 23°18′43″E
- Country: Poland
- Voivodeship: Podlaskie
- County: Hajnówka
- Gmina: Czeremcha

Zubacze [zuˈbat͡ʂɛ] is a village in the administrative district of Gmina Czeremcha, within Hajnówka County, Podlaskie Voivodeship, in north-eastern Poland, close to the border with Belarus.
