= Jancewicze =

- Village
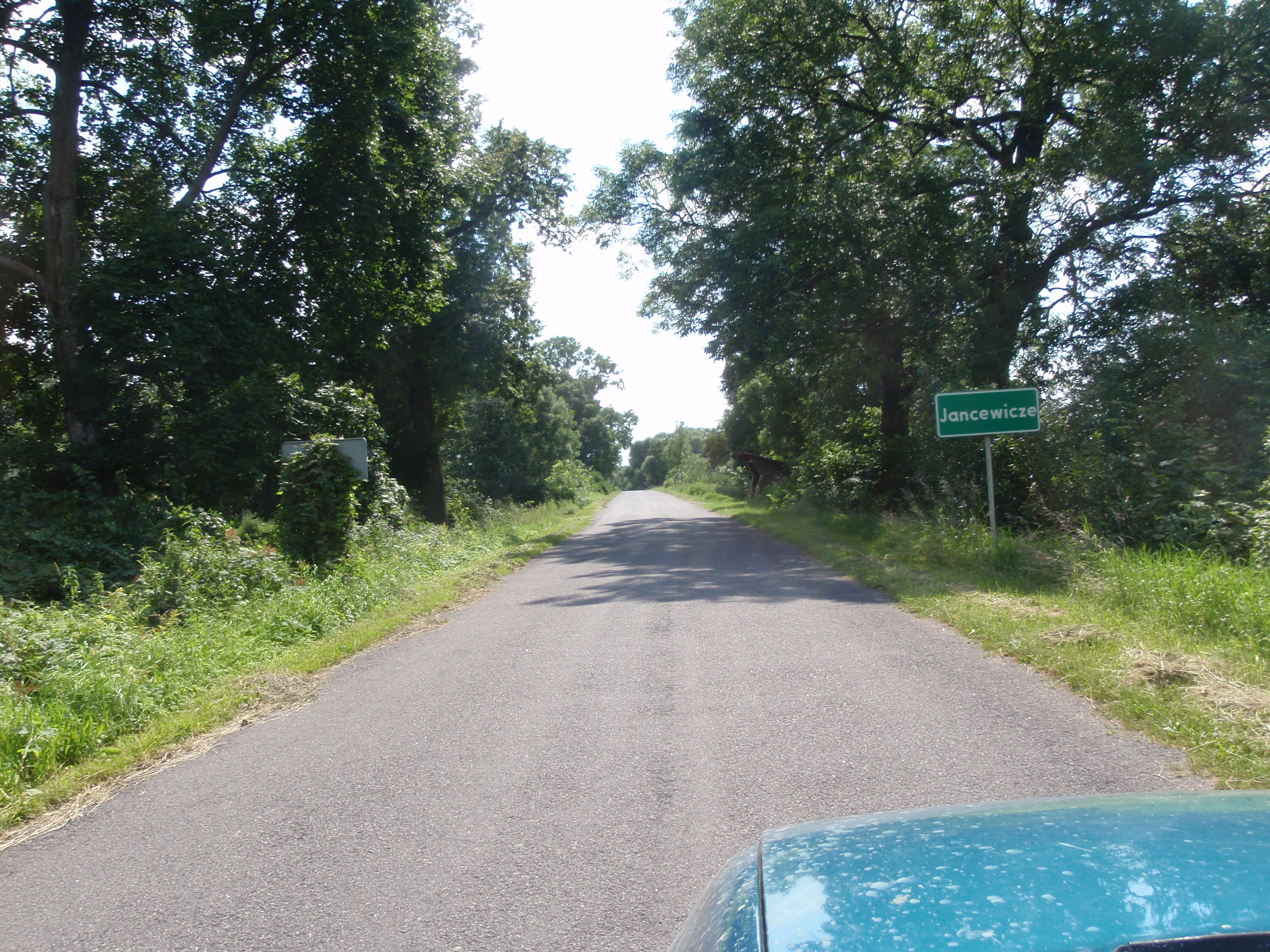
- Road sign in Jancewicze

- Location within Poland
- Coordinates: 51°26′11″N 23°17′47″E
- Country: Poland
- Voivodeship: Podlaskie
- County: Hajnówka
- Gmina: Czeremcha

Jancewicze [jant͡sɛˈvit͡ʂɛ] is a village in the administrative district of Gmina Czeremcha, within Hajnówka County, Podlaskie Voivodeship, in north-eastern Poland, close to the border with Belarus.
