= Terechy =

- Village
- Location within Poland
- Coordinates: 52°30′21″N 23°23′53″E
- Country: Poland
- Voivodeship: Podlaskie
- County: Hajnówka
- Gmina: Czeremcha

Terechy [tɛˈrɛxɨ] is a village in the administrative district of Gmina Czeremcha, within Hajnówka County, Podlaskie Voivodeship, in north-eastern Poland, close to the border with Belarus.
