= Smolnica =

Smolnica may refer to:

- Smolnica, Szamotuły County in Greater Poland Voivodeship (west-central Poland)
- Smolnica, Hajnówka County in Podlaskie Voivodeship (north-east Poland)
- Smolnica, Suwałki County in Podlaskie Voivodeship (north-east Poland)
- Smolnica, Złotów County in Greater Poland Voivodeship (west-central Poland)
- Smolnica, Silesian Voivodeship (south Poland)
- Smolnica, West Pomeranian Voivodeship (north-west Poland)
