= Nowe Lewkowo =

- Village
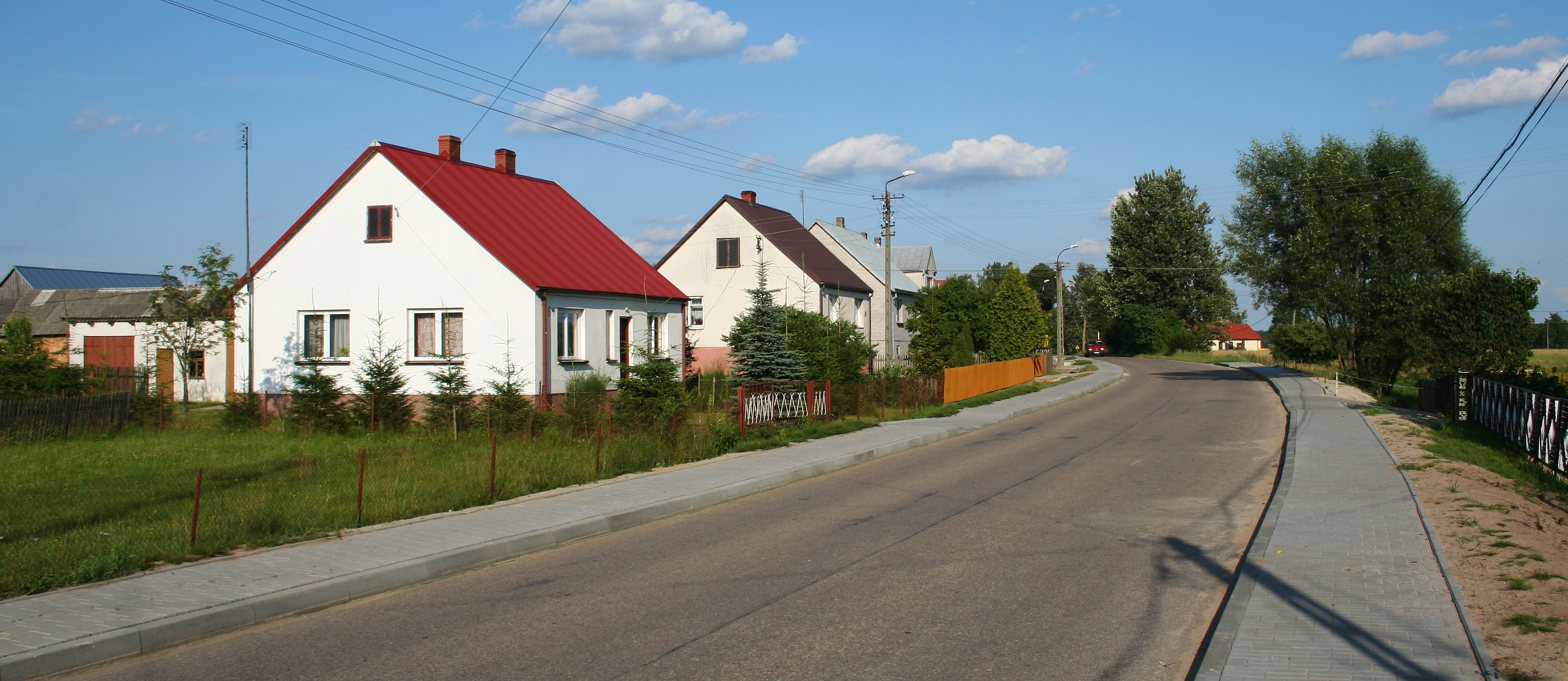

- Location within Poland
- Coordinates: 52°52′45″N 23°43′05″E
- Country: Poland
- Voivodeship: Podlaskie
- County: Hajnówka
- Gmina: Narewka

Population
  - Total: 300
- Time zone: UTC+1 (CET)
  - Summer (DST): UTC+2 (CEST)
- Vehicle registration: BHA

Nowe Lewkowo [ˈnɔvɛ lɛfˈkɔvɔ] is a village in the administrative district of Gmina Narewka, within Hajnówka County, Podlaskie Voivodeship, in north-eastern Poland, close to the border with Belarus, on the river Narewka.

== History ==
Following the joint German-Soviet invasion of Poland, which started World War II in September 1939, the village was first occupied by the Soviet Union until 1941, and then by Germany until 1944. In July 1941, the German Police Battalion 322 expelled the entire population. Six men and six women were deported to forced labour in Germany. The purpose of the expulsion was to hinder the activities of the resistance movement in the area.
