= Porosłe =

- Village
- Location within Poland
- Coordinates: 52°53′19″N 23°48′37″E
- Country: Poland
- Voivodeship: Podlaskie
- County: Hajnówka
- Gmina: Narewka

Porosłe [pɔˈrɔswɛ] is a village in the administrative district of Gmina Narewka, within Hajnówka County, Podlaskie Voivodeship, in north-eastern Poland, close to the border with Belarus.
