= Pożniki =

- Village
- Location within Poland
- Coordinates: 52°31′6″N 23°17′52″E
- Country: Poland
- Voivodeship: Podlaskie
- County: Hajnówka
- Gmina: Czeremcha

Pożniki [pɔʐˈniki] is a village in the administrative district of Gmina Czeremcha, within Hajnówka County, Podlaskie Voivodeship, in north-eastern Poland, close to the border with Belarus.
