= Prety =

Prety may refer to:

- Pręty, Podlaskie, Poland
- Préty, Saône-et-Loire department, France

== See also ==
- Pretty (disambiguation)
