= Zabrody, Podlaskie Voivodeship =

Zabrody
- Village
- Location within Poland
- Coordinates: 52°52′8″N 23°49′52″E
- Country: Poland
- Voivodeship: Podlaskie
- County: Hajnówka
- Gmina: Narewka
- Time zone: UTC+1 (CET)
  - Summer (DST): UTC+2 (CEST)
- Vehicle registration: BHA

Zabrody [zaˈbrɔdɨ] is a village in the administrative district of Gmina Narewka, within Hajnówka County, Podlaskie Voivodeship, in north-eastern Poland, close to the border with Belarus.

== History ==
Following the joint German-Soviet invasion of Poland, which started World War II in September 1939, the village was first occupied by the Soviet Union until 1941, and then by Germany until 1944. In July 1941, the German Police Battalion 322 expelled the entire population, and then plundered and destroyed the village. Six young men were deported to forced labour in Germany, and two people aged 21 and 14 were later murdered as punishment for trying to return to Zabrody. After the war, the village was rebuilt.
