= Siemianówka =

- Village
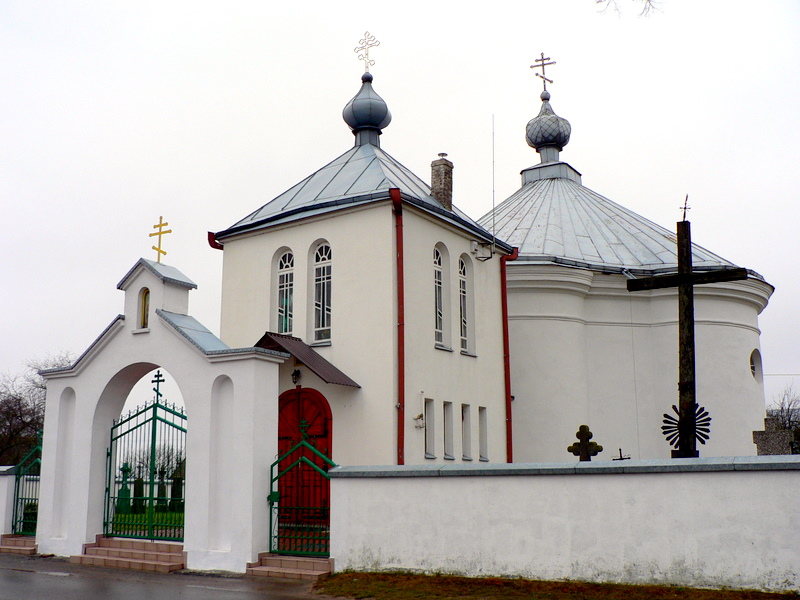
- Belarusian Orthodox St. George Church

- Location within Poland
- Coordinates: 52°53′58″N 23°50′21″E
- Country: Poland
- Voivodeship: Podlaskie
- County: Hajnówka
- Gmina: Narewka
- Population: 660

Siemianówka [ɕɛmjaˈnufka] is a village in the administrative district of Gmina Narewka, within Hajnówka County, Podlaskie Voivodeship, in north-eastern Poland, at the border with Belarus. The village lies approximately 9 km (6 mi) north-east of Narewka, 26 km (16 mi) north-east of Hajnówka, and 52 km (32 mi) south-east of the regional capital Białystok.
