= Opaka Duża =

- Village
- Location within Poland
- Coordinates: 52°32′N 23°27′E
- Country: Poland
- Voivodeship: Podlaskie
- County: Hajnówka
- Gmina: Czeremcha

Opaka Duża [ɔˈpaka ˈduʐa] is a village in the administrative district of Gmina Czeremcha, within Hajnówka County, Podlaskie Voivodeship, in north-eastern Poland, close to the border with Belarus.
