= Michnówka =

- Village
- Location within Poland
- Coordinates: 52°55′N 23°42′E
- Country: Poland
- Voivodeship: Podlaskie
- County: Hajnówka
- Gmina: Narewka
- Population: 140

Michnówka [mixˈnufka] is a village in the administrative district of Gmina Narewka, within Hajnówka County, Podlaskie Voivodeship, in north-eastern Poland, close to the border with Belarus.
