= Stare Masiewo =

- Village
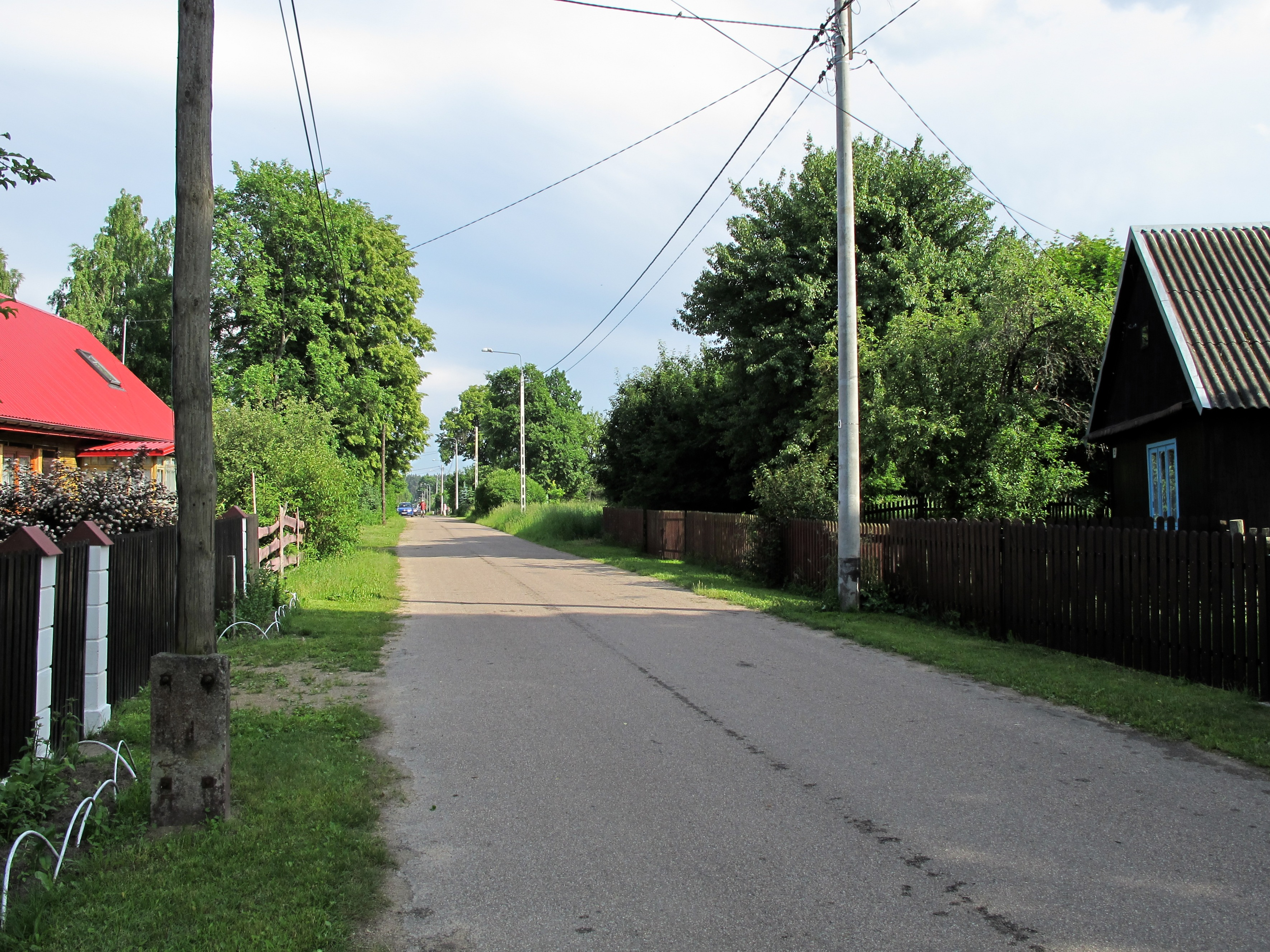

- Location within Poland
- Coordinates: 52°49′N 23°54′E
- Country: Poland
- Voivodeship: Podlaskie
- County: Hajnówka
- Gmina: Narewka
- Population: 150
- Time zone: UTC+1 (CET)
  - Summer (DST): UTC+2 (CEST)
- Vehicle registration: BHA

Stare Masiewo [ˈstarɛ maˈɕɛvɔ] is a village in the administrative district of Gmina Narewka, within Hajnówka County, Podlaskie Voivodeship, in north-eastern Poland, close to the border with Belarus.

== History ==
Following the joint German-Soviet invasion of Poland, which started World War II in September 1939, the village was first occupied by the Soviet Union until 1941, and then by Germany until 1944. In July 1941, the German Police Battalion 322 expelled the entire population, and then plundered and destroyed the village. In 1942, two former inhabitants were publicly hanged by the Germans in Białowieża, and one woman was deported to the Stutthof concentration camp and murdered there. The purpose of the expulsion was to hinder the activities of the resistance movement in the area. After the war some people returned, and the village was rebuilt.
