= Gajki =

Gajki may refer to the following places:

- Gajki, Podlaskie Voivodeship (north-east Poland)
- Gajki, Pomeranian Voivodeship (north Poland)
- Gajki, West Pomeranian Voivodeship (north-west Poland)
