= Mikłaszewo =

- Village
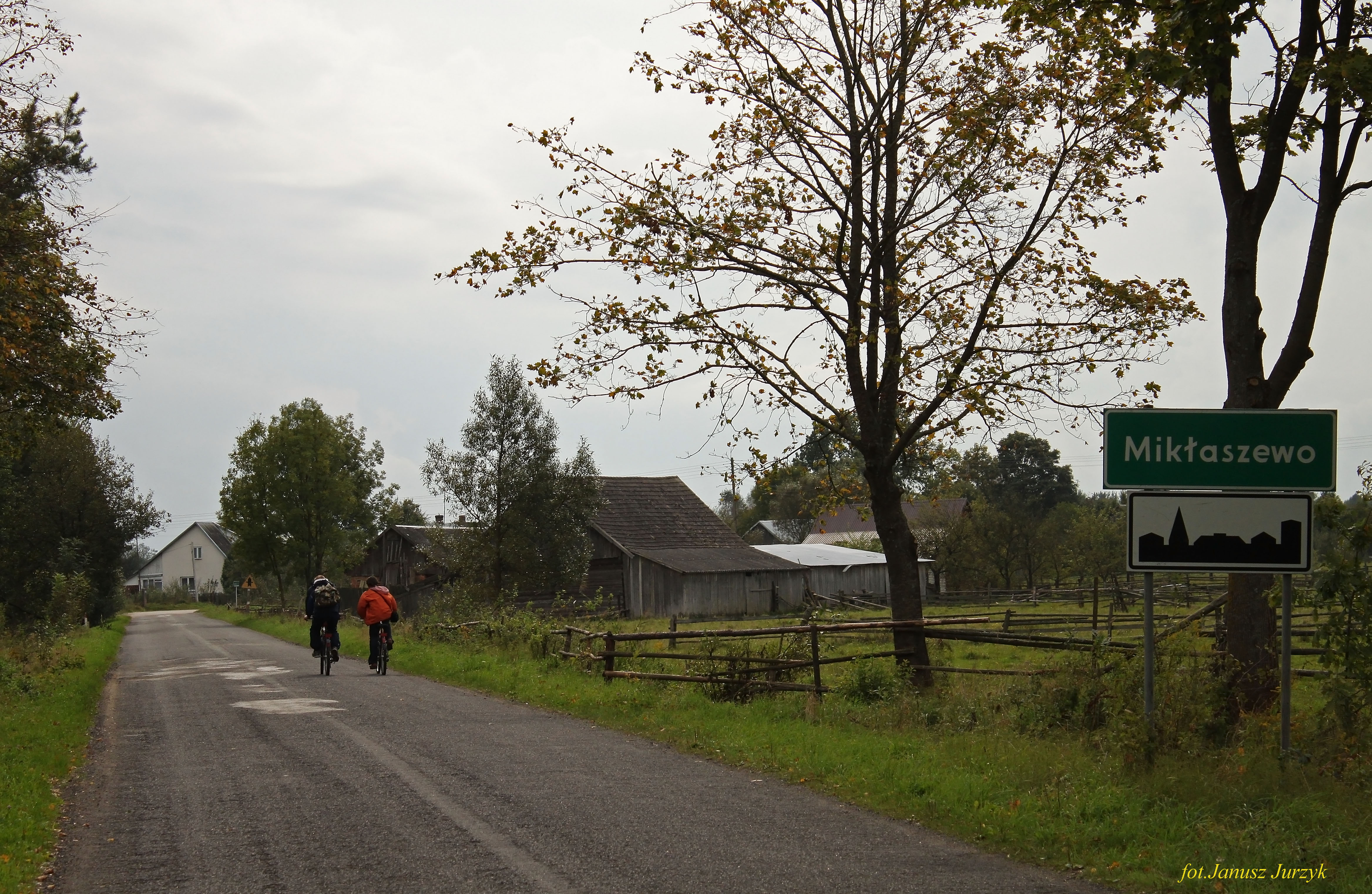
- Road sign in Mikłaszewo

- Location within Poland
- Coordinates: 52°50′32″N 23°46′19″E
- Country: Poland
- Voivodeship: Podlaskie
- County: Hajnówka
- Gmina: Narewka
- Population: 270
- Time zone: UTC+1 (CET)
  - Summer (DST): UTC+2 (CEST)
- Vehicle registration: BHA

Mikłaszewo ([mikwaˈʂɛvɔ]) is a village in the administrative district of Gmina Narewka, within Hajnówka County, Podlaskie Voivodeship, in north-eastern Poland, close to the border with Belarus.

== History ==
Following the joint German-Soviet invasion of Poland, which started World War II in September 1939, the village was first occupied by the Soviet Union until 1941, and then by Germany until 1944. In August 1941, the German Police Battalion 322 expelled the entire population, and then plundered and destroyed the village. One man, who returned to the village in autumn 1941, was brutally beaten and killed by the Germans. The purpose of the expulsion was to hinder the activities of the resistance movement in the area. After the war the village was rebuilt.
