= Gmina Czeremcha =

Gmina Czeremcha Czeremcha Commune
- Gmina
- Coat of arms
- Interactive map of Gmina Czeremcha
- Coordinates (Czeremcha): 52°31′7″N 23°20′53″E
- Country: Poland
- Voivodeship: Podlaskie
- County: Hajnówka
- Seat: Czeremcha

Area
  - Total: 96.73 km^{2} (37.35 sq mi)

Population (2006)
  - Total: 3,644
  - Density: 37.67/km^{2} (97.57/sq mi)
- Website: http://www.czeremcha.com.pl/

Gmina Czeremcha is a rural gmina (administrative district) in Hajnówka County, Podlaskie Voivodeship, in north-eastern Poland, on the border with Belarus. Its seat is the village of Czeremcha, which lies approximately 29 kilometres (18 mi) south-west of Hajnówka and 68 km (42 mi) south of the regional capital Białystok.

The gmina covers an area of 96.73 square kilometres (37.3 sq mi), and as of 2006 its total population is 3,644.

== Villages ==
Gmina Czeremcha contains the villages and settlements of Berezyszcze, Bobrówka, Borki, Chlewiszcze, Czeremcha, Czeremcha-Wieś, Derhawka, Gajki, Jancewicze, Konik, Kuzawa, Opaka Duża, Opalowanka, Osyp, Piszczatka, Podorabie, Pohulanka, Połowce, Pożniki, Repiszcza, Sielakiewicz, Stawiszcze, Terechy, Turowszczyzna, Wólka Terechowska and Zubacze.

== Neighbouring gminas ==
Gmina Czeremcha is bordered by the gminas of Kleszczele, Milejczyce and Nurzec-Stacja. It also borders Belarus.
