= Narewka (river) =

Narewka Нараўка
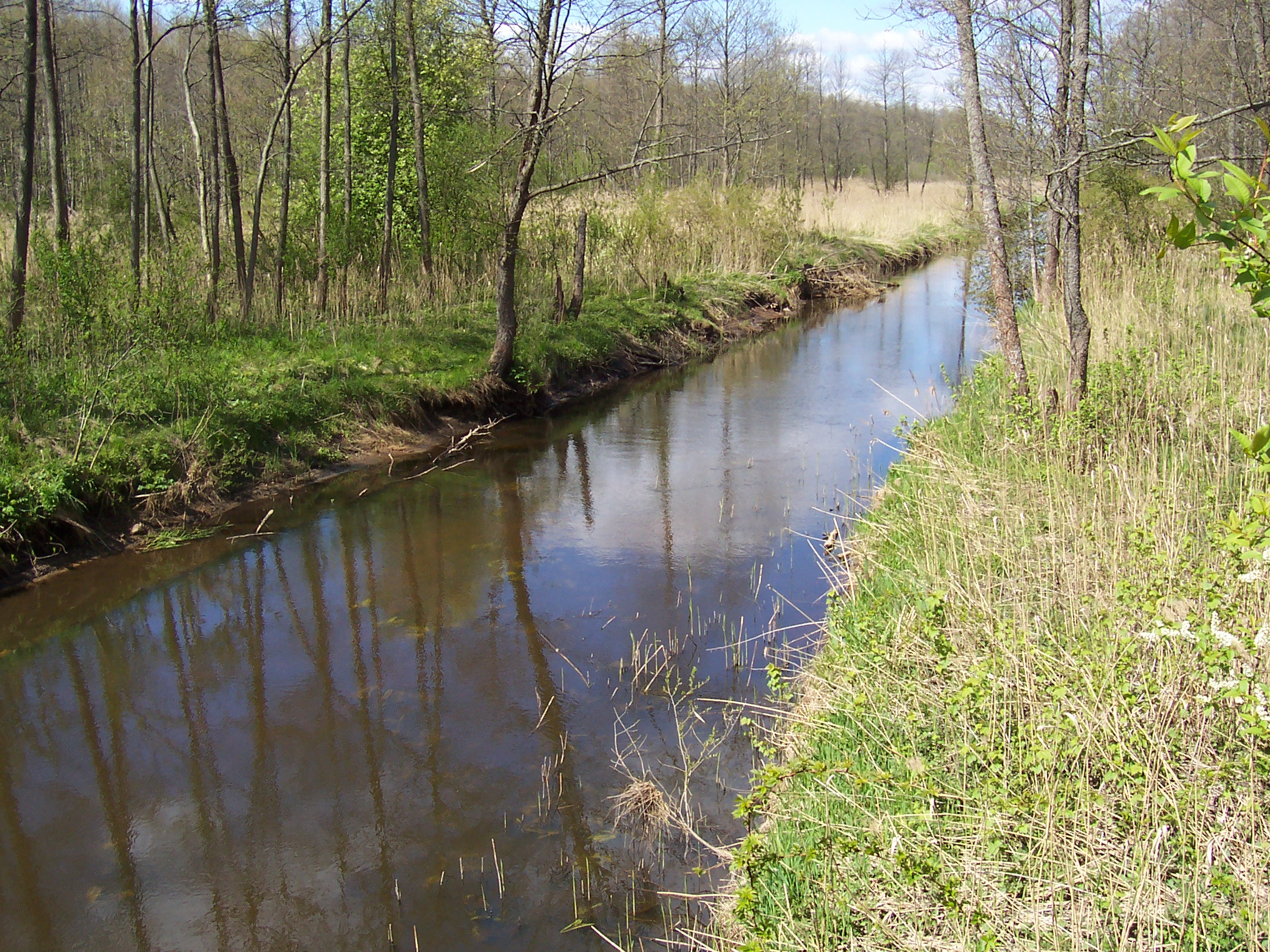
- Narewka River in the Bialowieza Forest, Poland

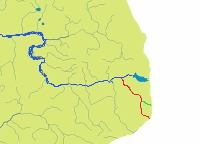
- Narewka (in red) on the map of the tributary rivers of Narew (blue)

Location
- Country: Belarus, Poland
- Voblast / Voivodeship: Hrodna, Podlaskie

Physical characteristics
- Source
  - location: south-eastern part of the Bialowieza Forest, Belarus
  - coordinates: 52°52′25″N 24°13′9″E
  - elevation: 159 m (522 ft)
- Mouth
  - location: Narew near Bieńdziuga, Poland
  - coordinates: 52.9314°N 23.6517°E
  - elevation: 137 m (449 ft)
- Length: 61.1 km (38.0 mi)
- Basin size: 711 km^{2} (275 sq mi)
- Discharge
  - location: Wilcze Gardło on the Narew

Basin features
- Progression: Narew→ Vistula→ Baltic Sea

The Narewka (Polish pronunciation: [naˈrɛfka]; Belarusian Нараўка) River is a left-bank tributary of the Narew River in western Belarus and northeastern Poland.

== Etymology ==
The Narewka River's name comes from a Proto-Indo-European root, *nr, primarily associated with "water" (compare Narva, Neretva, Neris, Ner, and Nur).

== Geography ==
The Narewka flows through the European region known as the Wysoczyzny Podlasko-Białoruskie (Podlasie–Belarus Plateau) in Poland's Podlaskie Voivodeship and Belarus' Grodno Region. A major part of the river flows through the Białowieża Forest. The Narewka River is the main watercourse of the Polish part of the Białowieża Forest.

The river is 61.1 km long, including 21.7 kilometers in the Republic of Belarus.

Catchment (basin) covers an area Narewka 710.7 km^{2}, of which the Polish border is 491.32 km. Within the forest is 380 km^{2} catchment area, part of which falls in the Białowieża National Park. Catchment forest cover is 49.9%. Until dry, the Narewka flowed through quite a muddy valley. In the 1960s has been draining uroczysko "Wild Nikora.

The width of the trough Narewka ranges from 5 to 15 m (at the mouth). The maximum depth at the measuring point in Bialowieza: 201 cm. The rate of flow is 2 km/h.

== History ==
Narewka River is marked on the first map of Bialowieza, line drawn in 1784 by the royal surveyor Michael Połchowskiego. The documents appear much earlier.

In December 1409 Władysław Jagiełło took place in Bialowieza Forest a great hunt, making the stocks of meat before the battle of Grunwald. The meat is in the spring of next year, the river was floated Narewka, Narew and the Vistula to Plock.

In 1559 a partial separation was carried out from Bialowieza Forest Bielsko (Ladzkiej). Narewka River to the mouth of the Narew, along with the river Wieliczanka constituted the boundary between forests.

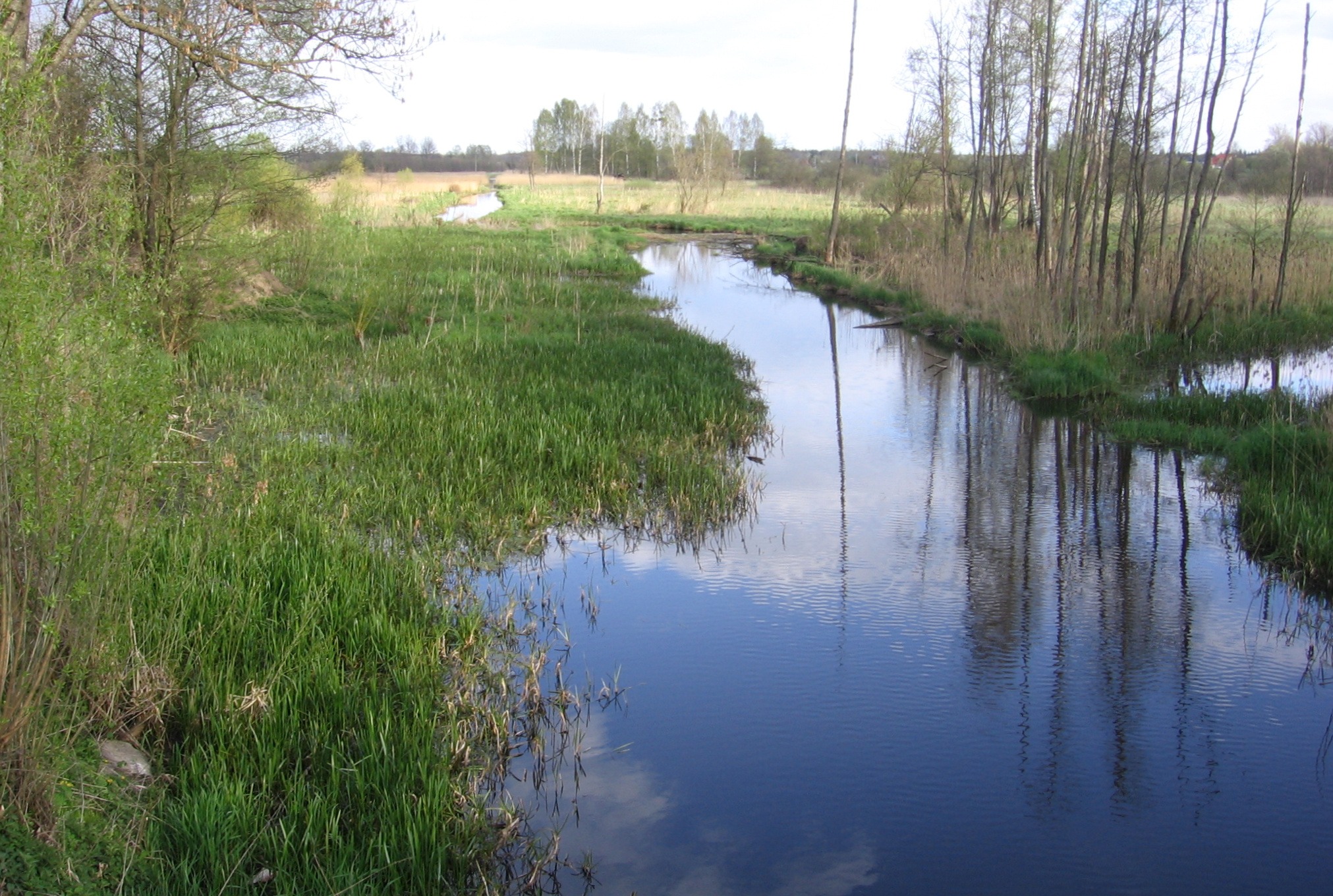
Narewka in Białowieża

== Cities and towns ==
Villages: Białowieża, Pogorzelce, Narewka, Nowe Lewkowo and Stare Lewkowo.

== Tributaries ==
- L Waliczówka
- L Jabłoniówka
- R Bobrówka
- L Okulinka
- L Jelonka
- R Braszcza
- R Hwoźna

- R Sirota

- L Przedzielna
- R Orłówka
- L Łutownia

- R Krynica

- R Złota

- L Jelonka

- L Pierierownica
- L Tisovka

Left Bank	Right Bank	Municipality	Characteristics	Country
			Bialowieza Forest	Belarus
Łutownia			Bialowieza Forest	Poland
Przedzielna				Poland
	Orłówka			Poland
	Hwoźna			Poland
	Braszcza			Poland
		Wilcze Gardło	mouth of the river at the Narew	Poland
