= Czeremcha, Podlaskie Voivodeship =

Czeremcha
- Village
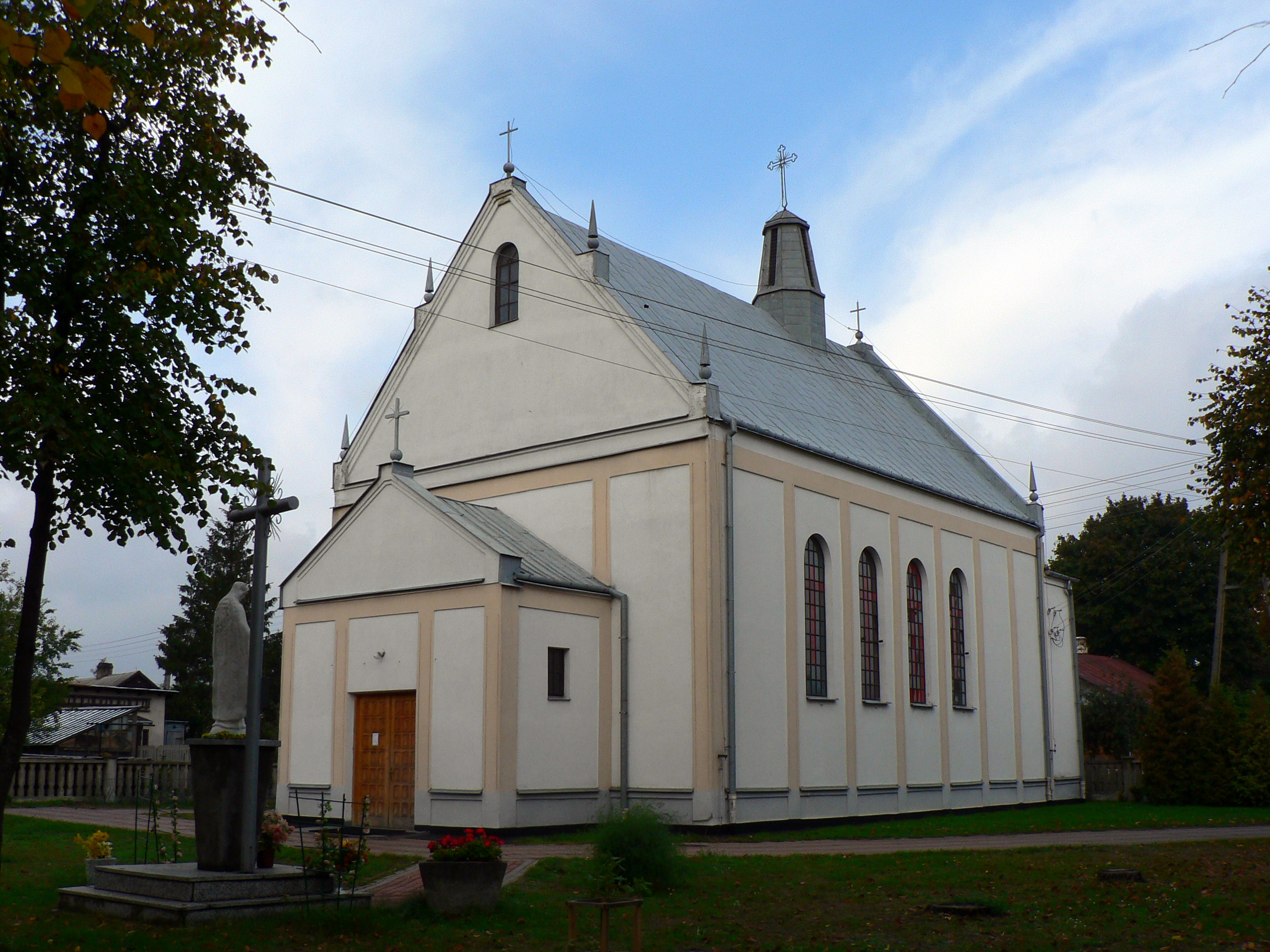
- Czeremcha Roman Catholic church
- Interactive map of Czeremcha
- Location within Poland
- Coordinates: 52°31′7″N 23°20′53″E
- Country: Poland
- Voivodeship: Podlaskie
- County: Hajnówka
- Gmina: Czeremcha
- Population: 2,500
- Website: http://www.czeremcha.com.pl

Czeremcha [t͡ʂɛˈrɛmxa] is a village in Hajnówka County, Podlaskie Voivodeship, in eastern Poland, close to the border with Belarus. It is the seat of the gmina (administrative district) called Gmina Czeremcha.

It is a rail junction, with connections going westwards to Siedlce, northwards to Bielsk Podlaski and eastwards to Hajnówka. At the start of World War II it was the site of aerial bombardment described by journalist Mendel Moses.
