= Podlewkowie =

- Village
- Location within Poland
- Coordinates: 52°52′N 23°43′E
- Country: Poland
- Voivodeship: Podlaskie
- County: Hajnówka
- Gmina: Narewka

Podlewkowie [pɔdlɛfˈkɔvjɛ] is a village in the administrative district of Gmina Narewka, within Hajnówka County, Podlaskie Voivodeship, in north-eastern Poland, close to the border with Belarus.
