= Osyp, Poland =

Osyp
- Settlement
- Location within Poland
- Coordinates: 52°29′15″N 23°17′45″E
- Country: Poland
- Voivodeship: Podlaskie
- County: Hajnówka
- Gmina: Czeremcha

Osyp [ˈɔsɨp] is a settlement in the administrative district of Gmina Czeremcha, within Hajnówka County, Podlaskie Voivodeship, in north-eastern Poland, close to the border with Belarus.
