= Smolnica, Hajnówka County =

Village in Gmina Narewka, Poland

Smolnica
- Village
- Location within Poland
- Coordinates: 52°57′50″N 23°43′10″E
- Country: Poland
- Voivodeship: Podlaskie
- County: Hajnówka
- Gmina: Narewka

Smolnica [smɔlˈnit͡sa] is a village in the administrative district of Gmina Narewka, within Hajnówka County, Podlaskie Voivodeship, in north-eastern Poland, close to the border with Belarus.
