= Gmina Narewka =

Gmina Narewka Narewka Commune
- Gmina
- Coat of arms
- Interactive map of Gmina Narewka
- Coordinates (Narewka): 52°50′10″N 23°45′27″E
- Country: Poland
- Voivodeship: Podlaskie
- County: Hajnówka
- Seat: Narewka

Government
  - Mayor: Mikołaj Pawilcz

Area
  - Total: 339.48 km^{2} (131.07 sq mi)

Population (2006)
  - Total: 4,019
  - Density: 11.84/km^{2} (30.66/sq mi)
- Website: http://www.narewka.pl

Gmina Narewka (Belarusian: Гміна Нараўка) is a rural gmina (administrative district) in Hajnówka County, Podlaskie Voivodeship, in north-eastern Poland, on the border with Belarus. Its seat is the village of Narewka, which lies approximately 18 kilometres (11 mi) north-east of Hajnówka and 51 km (32 mi) south-east of the regional capital Białystok.

The gmina covers an area of 339.48 square kilometres (131.1 sq mi), and as of 2006 its total population is 4,019.

It is one of five Polish/Belarusian bilingual Gmina in Podlaskie Voivodeship regulated by the Act of 6 January 2005 on National and Ethnic Minorities and on the Regional Languages, which permits certain gminas with significant linguistic minorities to introduce a second, auxiliary language to be used in official contexts alongside Polish.

== Villages ==
Gmina Narewka contains the villages and settlements of Babia Góra, Baczyńscy, Bazylowe, Bernacki Most, Bielscy, Bokowe, Borowe, Chomińszczyzna, Cieremki, Dąbrowa, Eliaszuki, Gnilec, Grodzisk, Gruszki, Guszczewina, Janowo, Kapitańszczyzna, Kasjany, Kordon, Kruhlik, Krynica, Łańczyno, Leśna, Łozowe, Ludwinowo, Łuka, Maruszka, Michnówka, Mikłaszewo, Minkówka, Mostki, Narewka, Nowe Lewkowo, Nowe Masiewo, Nowiny, Ochrymy, Olchówka, Osowe, Pasieki, Planta, Podlewkowie, Połymie, Porosłe, Pręty, Siemianówka, Siemieniakowszczyzna, Skupowo, Słobódka, Smolnica, Stare Lewkowo, Stare Masiewo, Stary Dwór, Stoczek, Suszczy Borek, Świnoroje, Zabłotczyzna, Zabrody and Zamosze.

== Neighbouring gminas ==
Gmina Narewka is bordered by the gminas of Białowieża, Hajnówka, Michałowo and Narew. It also borders Belarus.
