= Hajnówka County =

Hajnówka County Powiat hajnowski
- County
- Flag Coat of arms

- Location within the voivodeship
- Coordinates (Hajnówka): 52°44′N 23°34′E
- Country: Poland
- Voivodeship: Podlaskie
- Seat: Hajnówka
- Gminas: Total 9 (incl. 1 urban): Hajnówka; Gmina Białowieża; Gmina Czeremcha; Gmina Czyże; Gmina Dubicze Cerkiewne; Gmina Hajnówka; Gmina Kleszczele; Gmina Narew; Gmina Narewka

Area
  - Total: 1,623.65 km^{2} (626.89 sq mi)

Population (2019)
  - Total: 42,851
  - Density: 26.392/km^{2} (68.354/sq mi)
  - Urban: 21,830
  - Rural: 21,021
- Car plates: BHA
- Website: www.powiat.hajnowka.pl

Hajnówka County (Polish: powiat hajnowski) is a unit of territorial administration and local government (powiat) in Podlaskie Voivodeship, north-eastern Poland, on the border with Belarus. It came into being on January 1, 1999, as a result of the Polish local government reforms passed in 1998. Its administrative seat and largest town is Hajnówka, which lies 51 kilometres (32 mi) south-east of the regional capital Białystok. The only other town in the county is Kleszczele, lying 25 km (16 mi) south-west of Hajnówka.

The county covers an area of 1,623.65 square kilometres (626.9 sq mi). As of 2019 its total population is 42,851, out of which the population of Hajnówka is 20,580, that of Kleszczele is 1,250, and the rural population is 21,021.

== Neighbouring counties ==
Hajnówka County is bordered by Siemiatycze County to the south-west, Bielsk County to the west and Białystok County to the north. It also borders Belarus to the east.

== Administrative divisions ==
The county is subdivided into nine gminas (one urban, one urban-rural and seven rural). These are listed in the following table, in descending order of population.

Gmina	Type	Area (km^{2})	Population (2019)	Seat
Hajnówka	urban	21.3	20,580	
Gmina Hajnówka	rural	293.2	3,872	Hajnówka *
Gmina Narew	rural	339.5	3,476	Narew
Gmina Narewka	rural	339.5	3,634	Narewka
Gmina Czeremcha	rural	96.7	3,125	Czeremcha
Gmina Kleszczele	urban-rural	142.6	2,475	Kleszczele
Gmina Białowieża	rural	203.2	2,183	Białowieża
Gmina Czyże	rural	134.2	1,995	Czyże
Gmina Dubicze Cerkiewne	rural	151.2	1,511	Dubicze Cerkiewne
* seat not part of the gmina
