= Istok =

Istok may refer to:

== Places ==
- Istok, Kosovo (Istog), a town and municipality located in the district of Peja, Kosovo
- Istok (river) (Istog (river)), originating near the city of Istok, Kosovo
- Bolshoy Istok, a village in Sudskoye Rural Settlement, Cherepovetsky District, Vologda Oblast, Russia
- Bystry Istok, a village and the administrative center of Bystroistoksky District of Altai Krai, Russia
- Istok, Gmina Dubicze Cerkiewne, a village within Hajnówka County, Podlaskie Voivodeship, in north-eastern Poland
- Istok, Gmina Narew, a village within Hajnówka County, Podlaskie Voivodeship, in north-eastern Poland
- Istok, Kabansky District, Republic of Buryatia, a village in Russia
- Krasny Istok, a village in Leninsky Selsoviet of Arkharinsky District, Amur Oblast, Russia
- Maly Istok, a village in Sudskoye Rural Settlement, Cherepovetsky District, Vologda Oblast, Russia
- Istok, Perm Krai, a village in Cherdynsky District, Perm Krai, Russia
- Istok, Pribaykalsky District, Republic of Buryatia, a village in Russia
- Radna Zona Istok, one of the industrial zones in Novi Sad
- Istok, Velikoustyugsky District, Vologda Oblast, a village in Russia
- Istok (Martian crater)

== People ==
- Istok Rodeš, a Croatian alpine ski racer

== Other ==
- Istok (magazine) a Russian-language online magazine published by the Islamic State (ISIL/ISIS/IS)
- NPP Istok or Istok State Scientific Production, a producer of electronic components for space and military use

== See also ==
- ISTTOK, an abbreviation for the "Instituto Superior Técnico TOKamak"
- iztok
