= Rutka, Hajnówka County =

Rutka
- Village
- Location within Poland
- Coordinates: 52°38′05″N 23°32′53″E
- Country: Poland
- Voivodeship: Podlaskie
- County: Hajnówka
- Gmina: Dubicze Cerkiewne

Rutka [ˈrutka] is a village in the administrative district of Gmina Dubicze Cerkiewne, within Hajnówka County, Podlaskie Voivodeship, in north-eastern Poland, close to the border with Belarus.

== history ==
The village was built in 1568, when King Sigismund Augustus leased the town of Kleszczele and its environs to Stanisław Czadzinski, It was included in the lease of 6 villages belonging to the city of Bielsko, They are Dubicze Cerkiewne, Grabowiec, Czechy Orlańskie, Jelonkę, Suchowolce, Rutka
