= Brotherhood of Belarusian Peasants =

Former Belarusian military organization

Brotherhood of Belarusian Peasants was a Belarusian military organization active in the spring of 1922 near Kleszczele in the Białystok Voivodeship of the Second Polish Republic. It engaged in sabotage activities and was one of the largest organizations of this type at the time. The group published its own newspaper, Biełaruski Partyzan. It operated for several months in 1922 before being dismantled by combined forces of the Polish army and police.

== Origins of the conflict ==
The initial enthusiasm among the Belarusian population after the liberation from Russian imperialism, sparked by Józef Piłsudski's declarations to give Belarusian activists positions in local self-government, quickly faded due to the actions of the Polish administration in Belarusian-inhabited areas. Local positions were staffed with Poles, Belarusian schools established during the German occupation were dismantled, Belarusian newspapers were shut down, and Orthodox churches were handed over to Catholics, even in places where they were a small minority. Additionally, social tensions were exacerbated by looting and assaults committed by Polish troops. As a result, the initial enthusiasm gradually turned into hatred, and the period of German occupation came to be remembered with nostalgia.

After the signing of the Treaty of Riga in September 1921, a meeting of parties associated with the Belarusian national movement was held in Prague. The treaty was denounced as the partition of Belarus, and its signatories were regarded as occupiers. It was decided that the only legitimate political representation of Belarus was the government of the Belarusian People's Republic, based in Kaunas.

The Belarusian partisan movement lacked a unified political or ideological character. It originated in the Białystok and Grodno lands, where it was also the most active. This was due to two main factors: the strong impact of Polish government policies in these areas and the lack of knowledge about Soviet realities. In regions where Soviet rule was better known, anti-Polish sentiment was weaker, and partisan activities took on an anti-communist character. In the Białystok region, the development of the partisan movement was primarily driven by the economic conditions of Belarusians and Polish policies toward them. Financial and material support, including weapons and ammunition, came from Germany and Lithuania.

In Podlachia, the Belarusian insurgent movement was particularly active in Bielsk County (in villages such as Grabowiec, Dobrowoda, Czechy Orlańskie, Witowo, Mołoczki, and Białowieża) and Sokółka County. This was largely due to the organizational skills of Herman Szymaniuk (known as Skamaroch) from Grabowiec and Wiera Masłowska from Ogrodniczki near Supraśl. The organization planned to begin armed resistance in March 1922. However, the authorities were informed in advance by a police informant who had infiltrated the group, leading to mass arrests. On 2 and 3 March, the police arrested both rank-and-file members and leaders of the organization. Among those detained was Masłowska, while Szymaniuk managed to escape to Kaunas, Lithuania.

== Szymaniuk's unit ==
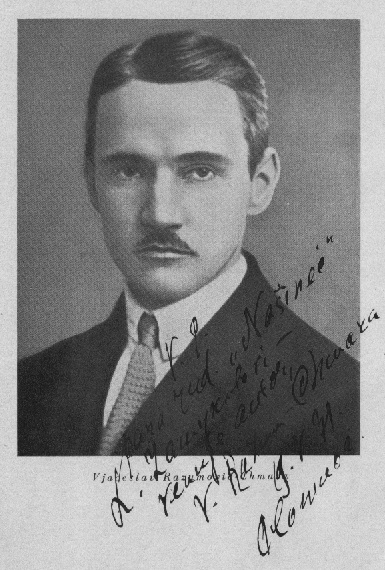
Wiaczesław Razumowicz, known as Chmara

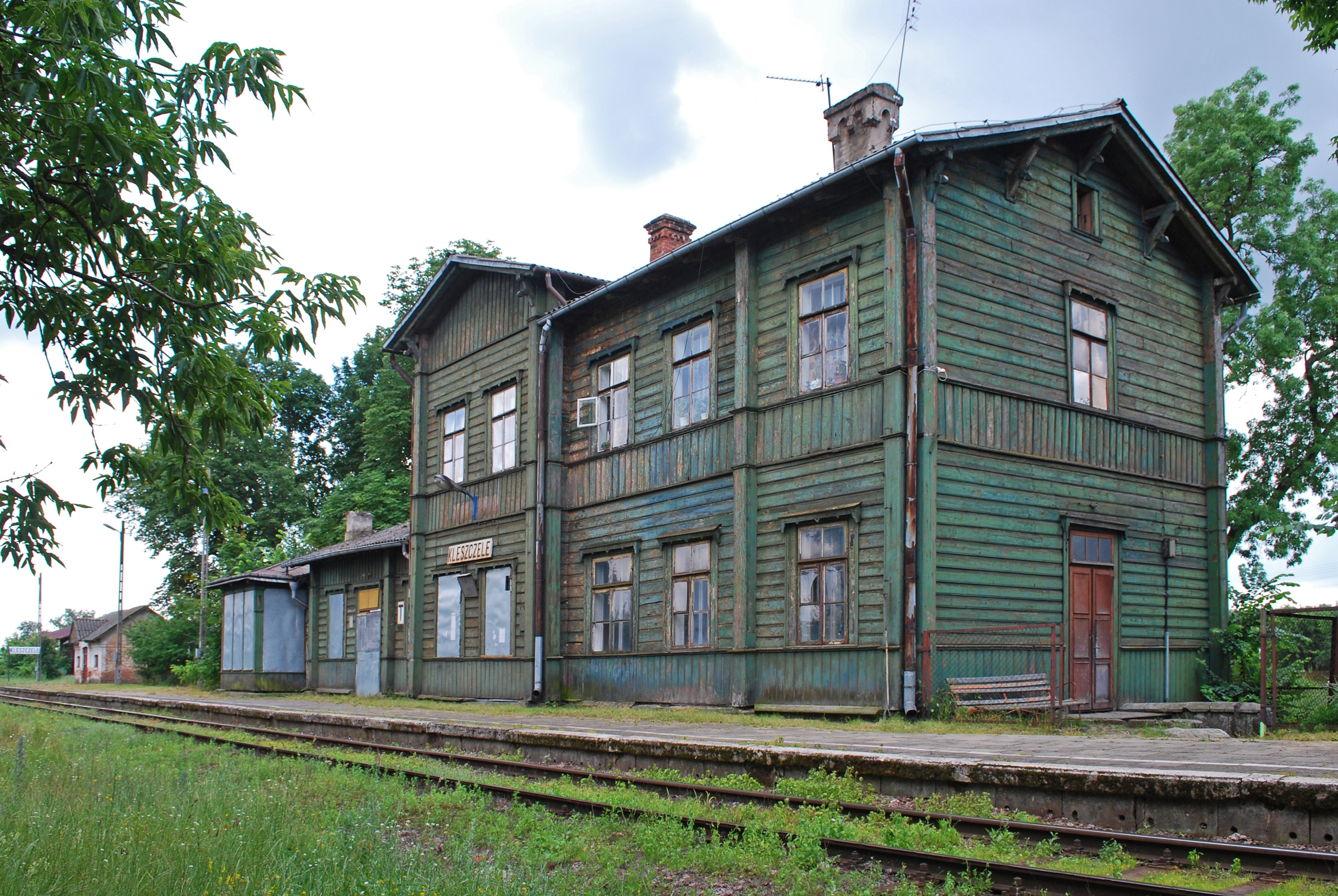
Historic train station in Kleszczele

Part of Szymaniuk's subordinates, who avoided arrest, took refuge in the Białowieża Forest, where they formed a partisan unit led by Jan Grycuk (pseudonym Czort). The local press referred to them as the "Czortowcy". Soon, Szymaniuk returned from Kaunas and took command of the unit, appointing Andrzej Tomaszuk, pseudonym Pietrenko, as his deputy. According to Tomaszuk's testimony, the group consisted of 24 people, while other sources report between 15 and 200 fighters. Szymaniuk was likely a Soviet agent.

On April 7, the unit robbed the gamekeeper's house in Witowo. On April 17, they set fire to wood stockpiles along the Czeremcha–Hajnówka railway line. The wood belonged to the Vilnius Directorate of the Polish State Railways. In the following days, they burned a railway bridge over the Narewka near Białowieża.

On the night of April 28–29, the partisans attacked the town of Kleszczele. They seized the police station, killing two officers. The attackers took "7 rifles with ammunition, uniforms, stamps, some correspondence, money, and personal belongings of the policemen". They then raided Onufry Sawicki's restaurant, killing the owner and his mother. They stole "500 thousand marks, gold coins, two silver watches, a gold chain, clothes, underwear, about 100 bottles of vodka, liqueur, and food". Disguised as policemen, they unsuccessfully tried to break into the Roman Catholic rectory. They left Kleszczele on a stolen cart.

In retaliation for the Kleszczele attack, the authorities organized a manhunt involving police and military forces. On May 6, after a skirmish in the Białowieża Forest, five saboteurs were captured. On May 24, a summary court in Białystok sentenced four of them to death: Andrzej Tomaszuk, Demian Martyniuk, Iwan Sacharczuk, and Iwan Piceluk. The youngest, 16-year-old Pantelejmon Niczyporuk, had his death sentence commuted to life imprisonment. Those who remained free ceased their armed activities and decided to flee to Lithuania. During the attempt to cross the border, two were apprehended, and the others returned to their villages. In the fall of 1922, Herman Szymaniuk intended to defect to the Polish side but was asked to reveal the entire structure of the underground organization. This request and the death sentences for his unit's members led him to abandon his initial plans. He chose to flee to the Belarusian SSR. According to unconfirmed reports, he became the director of a shoe factory in Mogilev. In 1937, he was arrested by the NKVD, and his fate remains unknown. Nothing is known about the subsequent fate of Jan Grycuk ("Czort").

During the manhunt, the police found the hideout of Skamaroch's unit in the forest. Among the items discovered were drafts of letters sent by Skamaroch, notes about members and supplies, six maps of the German General Staff, two jars of strychnine, and some of the loot from the raids.

Skamaroch's headquarters sent a number of letters and appeals to offices and public figures in the Second Polish Republic. An ultimatum was sent to Marshal Piłsudski, demanding the right of Belarusians to self-determination, cessation of the destruction of Orthodox churches, and other requests. A letter warning the Vilnius Directorate of State Railways about the timber shipment from the Białowieża Forest was also sent. Other letters were addressed to the Soviet embassy. The letters were signed with the seal of the Brotherhood of Belarusian Peasants.

The unit worked closely with the secret staff of the 4th Operational Group in Merkinė, Lithuania, under the Belarusian Socialist-Revolutionary Party, which aimed to create an independent Belarus. The head of the staff was Wiaczesław Razumowicz (pseudonym Chmara). Razumowicz later turned out to be a collaborator of the Polish police, helping to dismantle Belarusian organizations.

This was not the only Belarusian partisan unit operating in Podlachia at the time, but it was one of the largest and best-known. What distinguished it from other units was its well-organized network of informants and communication system. The members of this unit were exclusively involved in insurgent activities, while in other units, insurgency was often combined with agricultural work. Most units were formed to carry out a single operation.

== Biełaruski Partyzan ==
The unit published a newspaper titled Biełaruski Partyzan, with the first issue edited by Herman Szymaniuk, while subsequent issues were overseen by H. Plusza. The editorial office was allegedly located in the Main Staff of Belarusian Partisans in the Białowieża Forest. However, in reality, it was most likely published in Lithuania, possibly in Merkinė, at Razumowicz's headquarters. The newspaper contained anti-Polish propaganda, proclamations, and declarations, as well as articles commenting on the political situation in Eastern Europe. It also included updates on sabotage activities across Western Belarus. The publication ran from August to December 1922. The articles primarily focused on atrocities committed by the Polish side, portraying participation in the partisan movement as both a defense and revenge for perceived injustices. The idea of an independent Belarusian state was only vaguely outlined. One of the partisans, a deserter from the Polish army, explained his decision in the newspaper:

"The language was foreign and somehow repulsive (...), nothing could be understood or executed. The corporals called us boors and cattle and who knows what else, they beat and tormented us".

== Further fate of the uprising movement ==
From 14 to 22 May 1923, a trial was held at the District Court in Białystok for 45 people, marking the first political trial of the Belarusian minority in the Second Polish Republic. One of the main witnesses for the prosecution was Edward Lenkiewicz, a Polish police agent who infiltrated the Brotherhood of Belarusian Peasants and led to its exposure. The accused were charged with being part of a conspiracy aiming to detach part of Polish territory and create an independent Belarusian republic. Out of the 45 accused, only nine were motivated by patriotic reasons. Wiera Masłowska defended herself by arguing that she was doing exactly what Polish patriots had done before World War I – fighting for a free and united homeland. The others explained their actions as a response to the injustices they had suffered at the hands of Polish officials and soldiers.

The trial lasted for eight days. The court sentenced 20 of the accused to prison terms ranging from one year to life imprisonment. The harshest sentence was given to Szymon Maciejewicz, who was sentenced to life imprisonment with hard labor. 19 individuals were sentenced to prison terms ranging from one to ten years, and 25 were acquitted.

The partisan movement continued to grow in intensity in Podlachia, with the most significant armed resistance against Polish authority occurring in 1924. The government's policy towards the insurgents oscillated between two extremes – repression and attempts to find political solutions. After 1924, the movement gradually died down. One of the causes was the Polish government's policy, which included mass arrests and death sentences. In 1923, Germany and Lithuania stopped funding Belarusian organizations in Lithuania, which limited the capacity to build partisan structures in Poland. Another reason for the decline was the infiltration of the movement by communists, who were not interested in an independent Belarus but sought to strip the Belarusian organizations of their national ideology, preparing the ground for a future international revolution.

== Bibliography ==
- Mironowicz, Eugeniusz (1993). Białorusini w Polsce 1944-1949 [Belarusians in Poland 1944-1949] (in Polish). Warsaw: PWN.
