= Wygon =

Wygon may refer to the following places:

- Wygon, Lesser Poland Voivodeship (south Poland)
- Wygon, Gmina Dubicze Cerkiewne in Podlaskie Voivodeship (north-east Poland)
- Wygon, Gmina Hajnówka in Podlaskie Voivodeship (north-east Poland)
- Wygon, Lublin Voivodeship (east Poland)
- Wygon, Lubusz Voivodeship (west Poland)
- Wygon, West Pomeranian Voivodeship (north-west Poland)
