= Rutka =

Rutka may refer to:

- the Rutka (river) in Russia
- Rutka (musical), a play about the diary of Rutka Laskier
- Rutka, Hajnówka County in Podlaskie Voivodeship (north-east Poland)
- Rutka, Suwałki County in Podlaskie Voivodeship (north-east Poland)
- Rutka, Warmian-Masurian Voivodeship (north Poland)
