= Kosna =

Kosna may refer to:

- Kośna, Podlaskie Voivodeship, a village in Poland
- Kosna, Croatia, a village near Dvor
