= Kornyn =

Kornyn or Kornin (Ukrainian: Корнин) may refer to the following places:

- Kornyn, Zhytomyr Oblast, urban-type settlement in Popilnia Raion, Zhytomyr Oblast, Ukraine
- Kornyn, Rivne Oblast, village in Rivne Raion, Rivne Oblast, Ukraine
- Stary Kornin, village in Poland
