= Krągłe =

Krągłe ['krɔŋwe] may refer to:

== Places ==
- Krągłe, Podlaskie Voivodeship, in north-east Poland
- Krągłe, West Pomeranian Voivodeship, in north-west Poland

== See also ==
- "The Kragle", a super-weapon in The Lego Movie
