= Wojnówka, Podlaskie Voivodeship =

Wojnówka
- Village
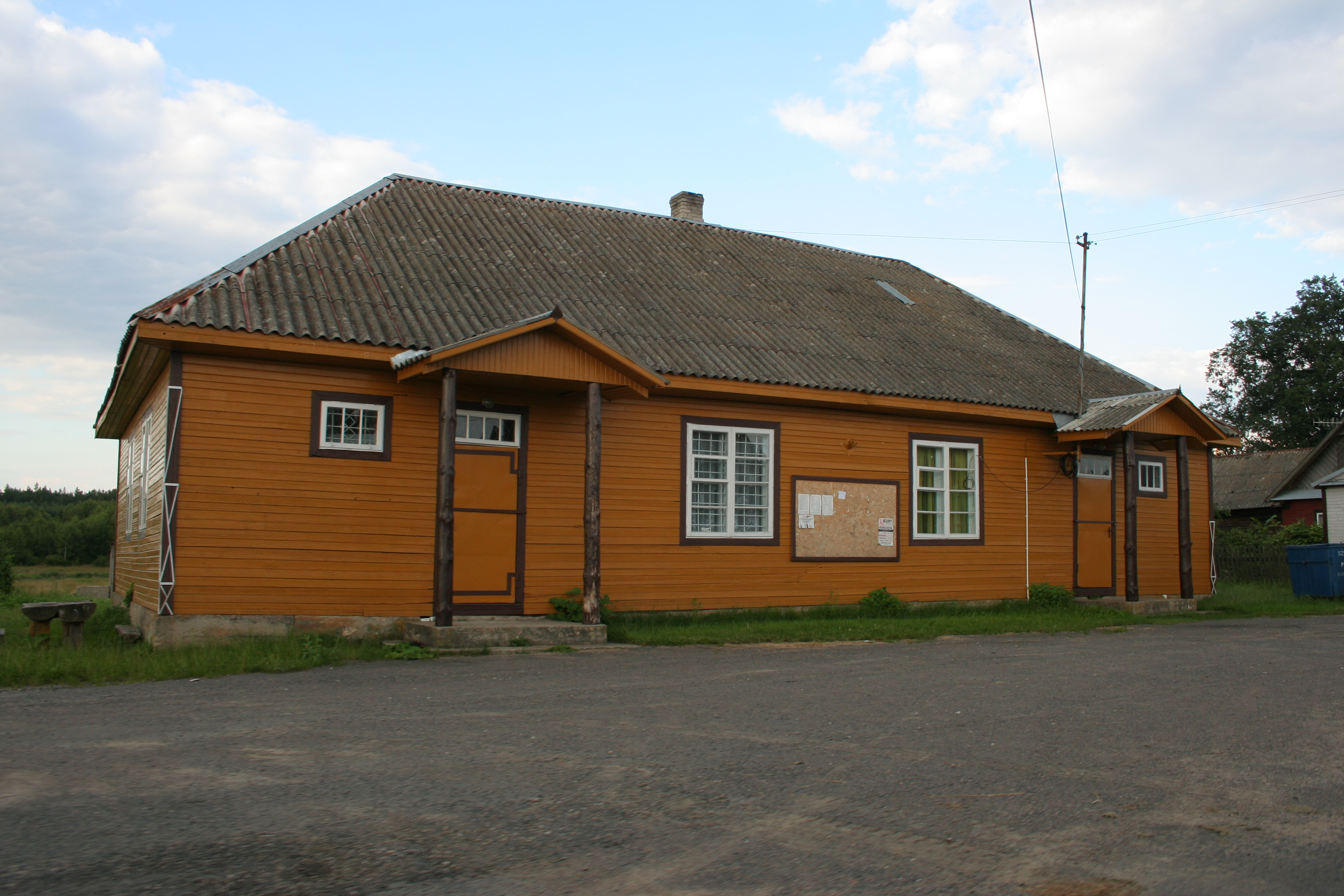

- Location within Poland
- Coordinates: 52°36′N 23°31′E
- Country: Poland
- Voivodeship: Podlaskie
- County: Hajnówka
- Gmina: Dubicze Cerkiewne

Wojnówka [vɔi̯ˈnufka] is a village in the administrative district of Gmina Dubicze Cerkiewne, within Hajnówka County, Podlaskie Voivodeship, in north-eastern Poland, close to the border with Belarus.
