= Jodłówka, Podlaskie Voivodeship =

Jodłówka
- Settlement
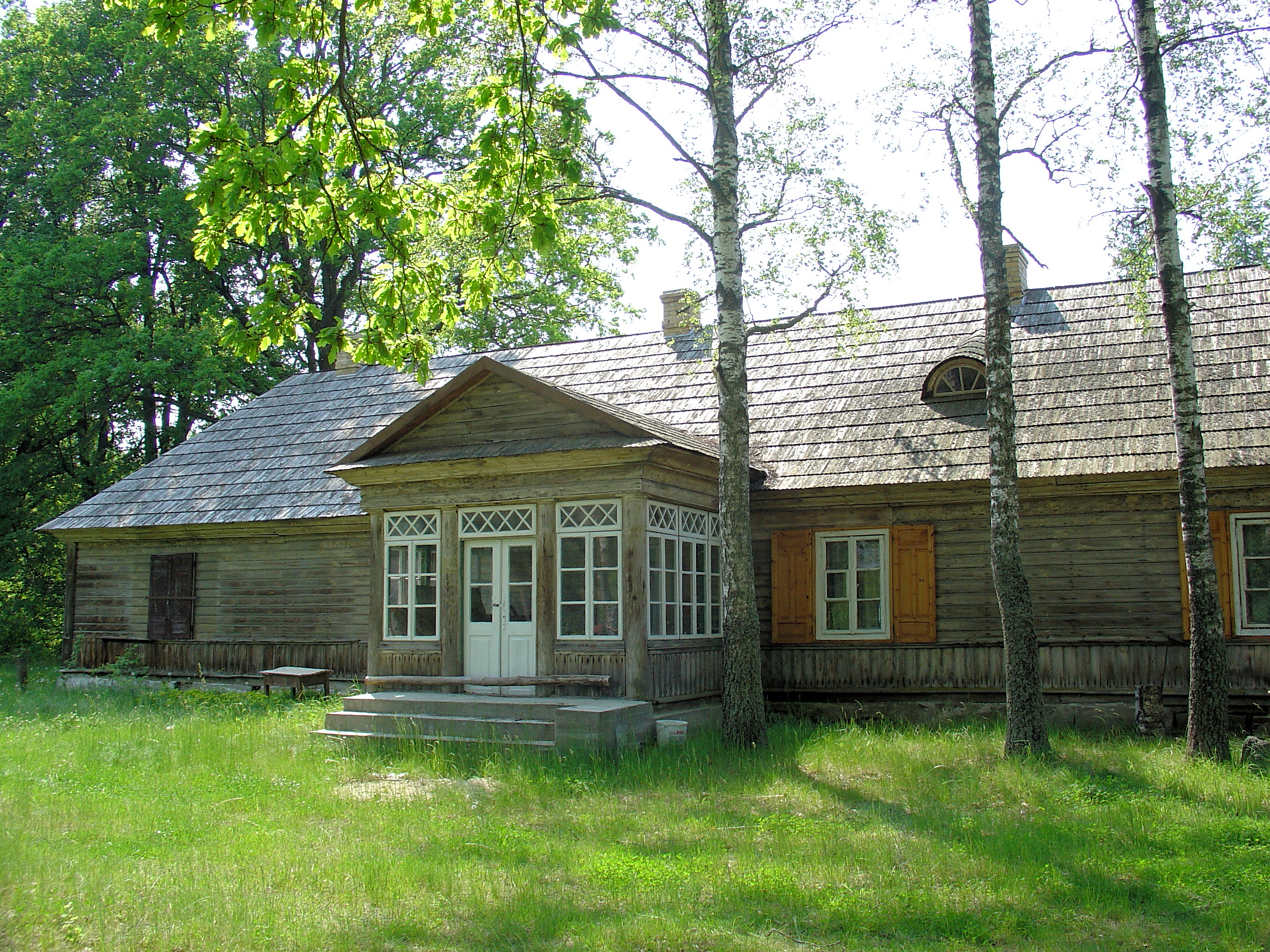
- Cultural monument in Jodłówka

- Location within Poland
- Coordinates: 52°35′N 23°31′E
- Country: Poland
- Voivodeship: Podlaskie
- County: Hajnówka
- Gmina: Dubicze Cerkiewne

Jodłówka [jɔdˈwufka] is a settlement in the administrative district of Gmina Dubicze Cerkiewne, within Hajnówka County, Podlaskie Voivodeship, in north-eastern Poland, close to the border with Belarus.
