= Pasieczniki Małe =

- Village
- Location within Poland
- Coordinates: 52°37′36″N 23°30′9″E
- Country: Poland
- Voivodeship: Podlaskie
- County: Hajnówka
- Gmina: Dubicze Cerkiewne
- Population: 20

Pasieczniki Małe [paɕɛt͡ʂˈniki ˈmawɛ] is a village in the administrative district of Gmina Dubicze Cerkiewne, within Hajnówka County, Podlaskie Voivodeship, in north-eastern Poland, close to the border with Belarus.
