= Gruzka =

- Village
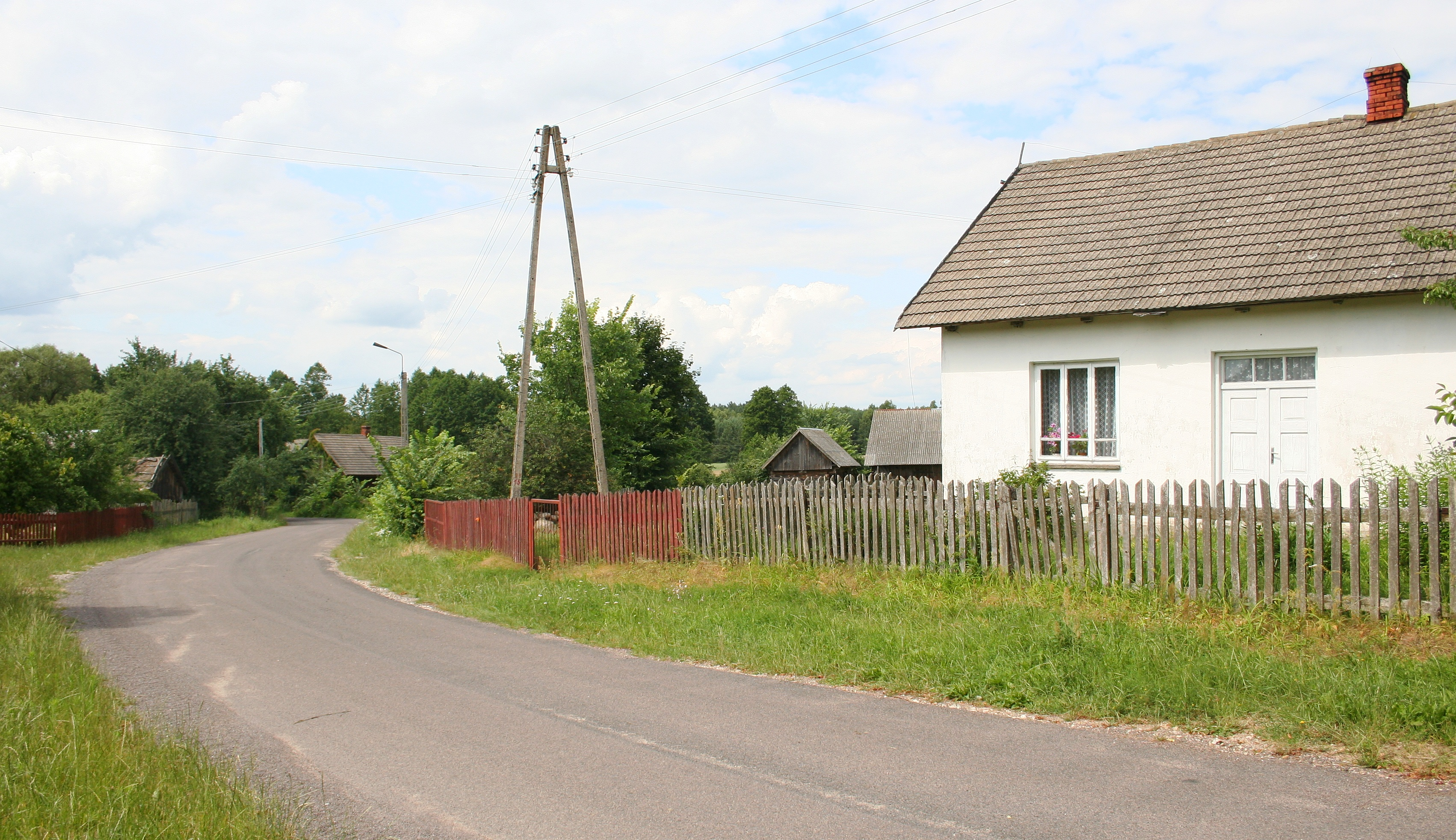

- Location within Poland
- Coordinates: 52°33′42″N 23°12′13″E
- Country: Poland
- Voivodeship: Podlaskie
- County: Hajnówka
- Gmina: Kleszczele

Gruzka [ˈɡruska] is a village in the administrative district of Gmina Kleszczele, within Hajnówka County, Podlaskie Voivodeship, in north-eastern Poland, close to the border with Belarus.

According to the 1921 census, the village was inhabited by 76 people, among whom 73 Orthodox, and 3 Mosaic. At the same time, 73 inhabitants declared Belarusian nationality, and 3 Jewish. There were 13 residential buildings in the village.
