= Koryciski =

- Village
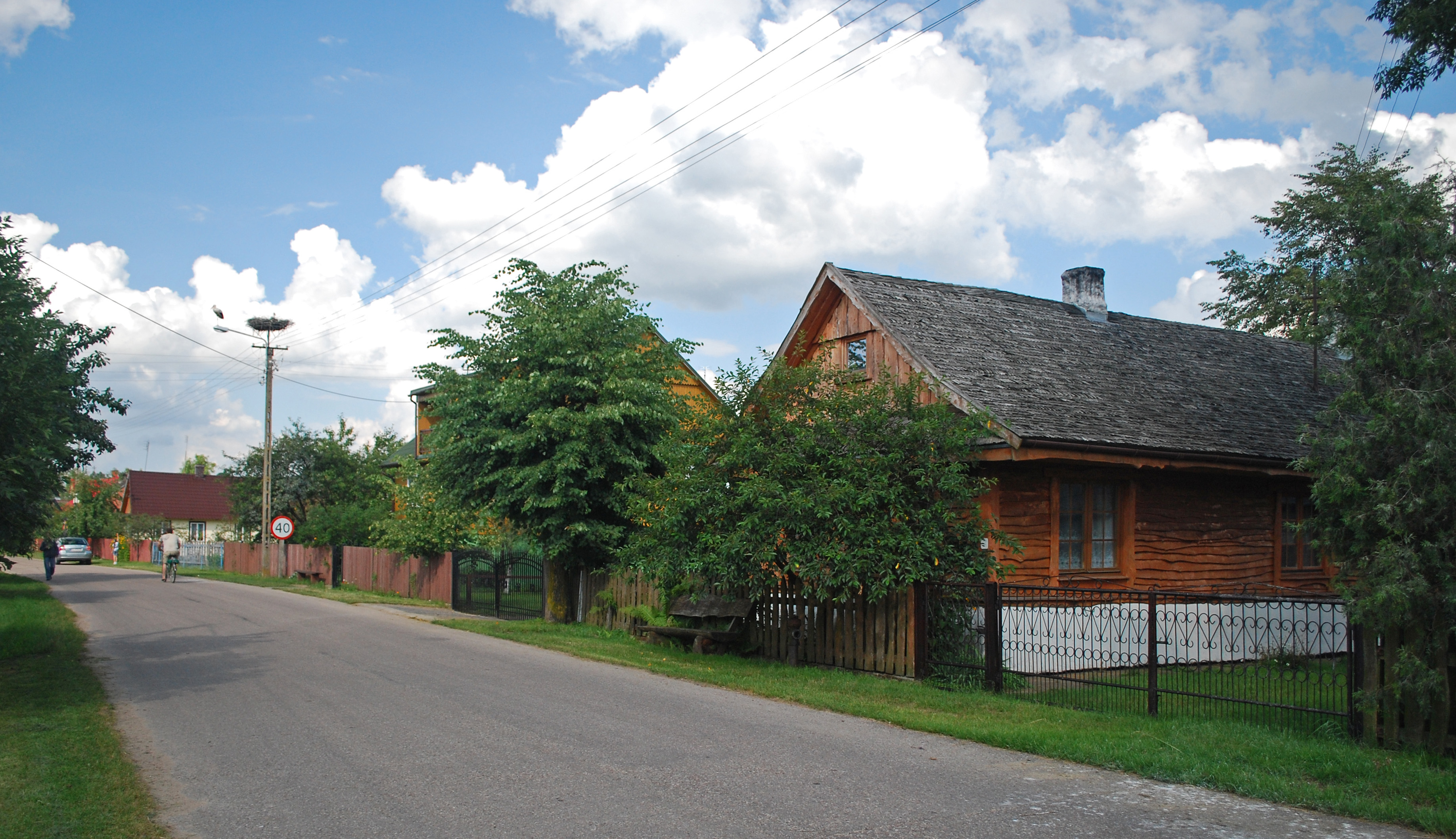
- Road in Koryciska

- Location within Poland
- Coordinates: 52°35′55″N 23°33′08″E
- Country: Poland
- Voivodeship: Podlaskie
- County: Hajnówka
- Gmina: Dubicze Cerkiewne
- Population: 150

Koryciski [kɔrɨˈt͡ɕiskʲi] is a village in the administrative district of Gmina Dubicze Cerkiewne. It is within Hajnówka County, Podlaskie Voivodeship, in north-eastern Poland, close to the border with Belarus.
