= Biała Straż =

- Village
- Location within Poland
- Coordinates: 52°34′N 23°28′E
- Country: Poland
- Voivodeship: Podlaskie
- County: Hajnówka
- Gmina: Kleszczele

Biała Straż [ˈbʲawa ˈstraʂ] is a village in the administrative district of Gmina Kleszczele, within Hajnówka County, Podlaskie Voivodeship, in north-eastern Poland, close to the border with Belarus.
