= Górny Gród =

- Village
- Location within Poland
- Coordinates: 52°40′54″N 23°25′56″E
- Country: Poland
- Voivodeship: Podlaskie
- County: Hajnówka
- Gmina: Dubicze Cerkiewne

Górny Gród [ˈɡurnɨ ˈɡrut] is a village in the administrative district of Gmina Dubicze Cerkiewne, within Hajnówka County, Podlaskie Voivodeship, in north-eastern Poland, close to the border with Belarus.
