= Nikiforowszczyzna =

- Village
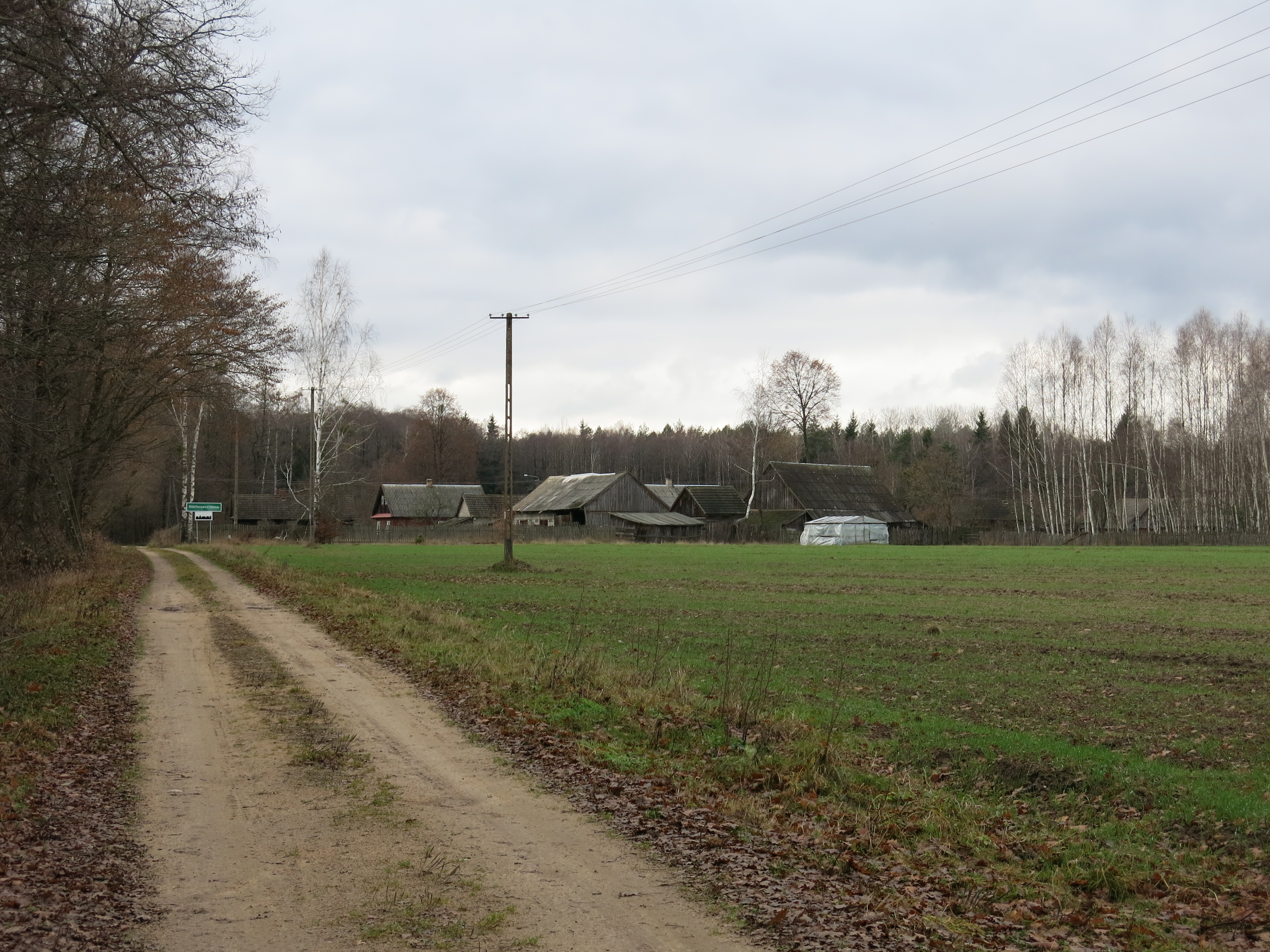

- Location within Poland
- Coordinates: 52°36′9″N 23°33′5″E
- Country: Poland
- Voivodeship: Podlaskie
- County: Hajnówka
- Gmina: Dubicze Cerkiewne

Nikiforowszczyzna [nikifɔrɔfʂˈt͡ʂɨzna] is a village in the administrative district of Gmina Dubicze Cerkiewne, within Hajnówka County, Podlaskie Voivodeship, in north-eastern Poland, close to the border with Belarus.
