= Siemiwołoki =

- Village
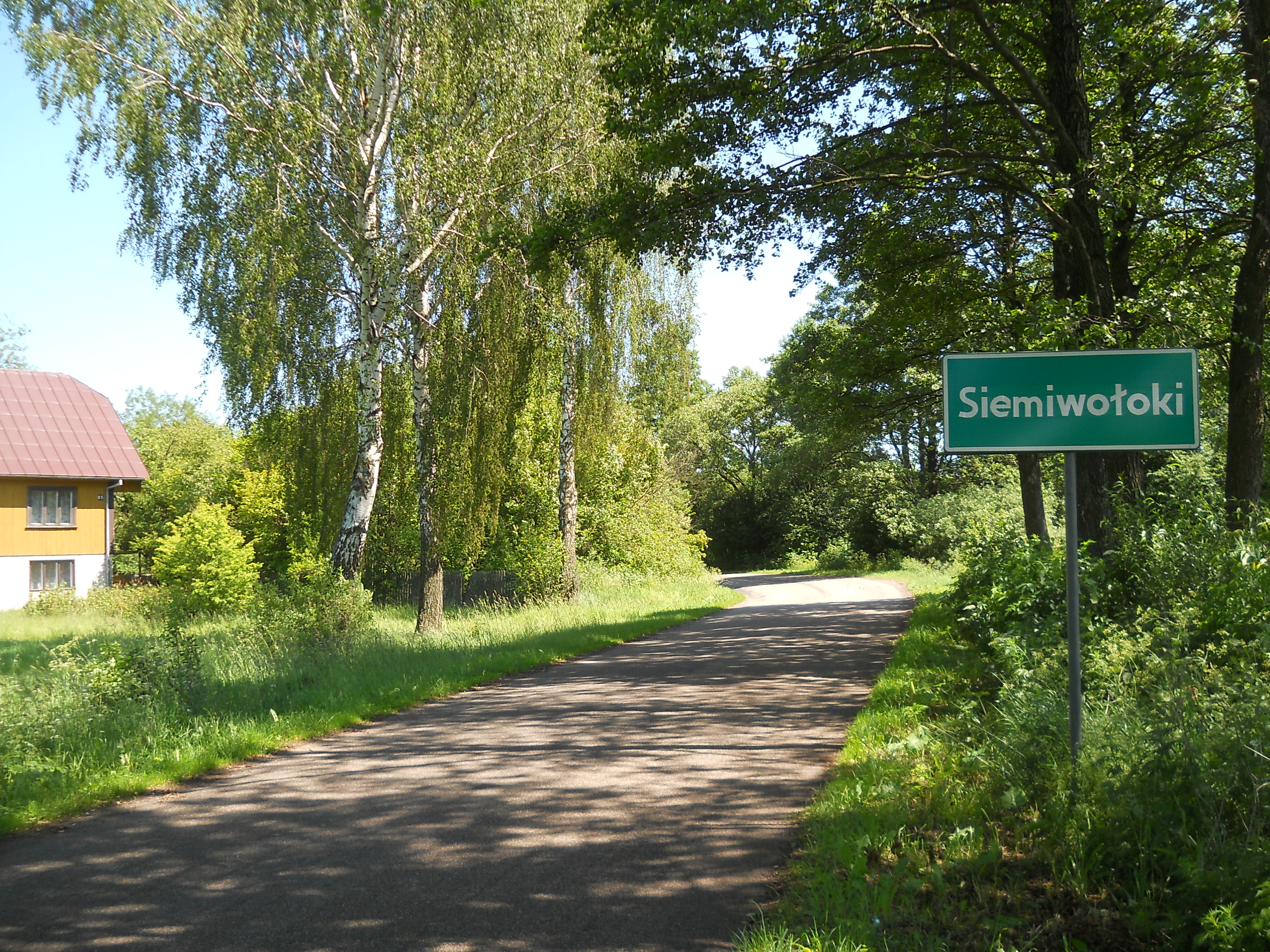
- Road sign in Siemiwoloki

- Location within Poland
- Coordinates: 52°42′05″N 23°28′09″E
- Country: Poland
- Voivodeship: Podlaskie
- County: Hajnówka
- Gmina: Dubicze Cerkiewne

Siemiwołoki [ɕɛmivɔˈwɔki] is a village in the administrative district of Gmina Dubicze Cerkiewne, within Hajnówka County, Podlaskie Voivodeship, in north-eastern Poland, close to the border with Belarus.
