= Gmina Dubicze Cerkiewne =

Gmina Dubicze Cerkiewne Dubicze Cerkiewne Commune
- Gmina
- Coat of arms
- Interactive map of Gmina Dubicze Cerkiewne
- Coordinates (Dubicze Cerkiewne): 52°39′N 23°26′E
- Country: Poland
- Voivodeship: Podlaskie
- County: Hajnówka
- Seat: Dubicze Cerkiewne

Area
  - Total: 151.19 km^{2} (58.37 sq mi)

Population (2006)
  - Total: 1,871
  - Density: 12.38/km^{2} (32.05/sq mi)
- Website: http://www.dubicze-cerkiewne.pl/

Gmina Dubicze Cerkiewne is a rural gmina (administrative district) in Hajnówka County, Podlaskie Voivodeship, in north-eastern Poland, on the border with Belarus. Its seat is the village of Dubicze Cerkiewne, which lies approximately 13 kilometres (8 mi) south-west of Hajnówka and 55 km (34 mi) south of the regional capital Białystok.

The gmina covers an area of 151.19 square kilometres (58.4 sq mi), and as of 2006 its total population is 1,871.

== Villages ==
Gmina Dubicze Cerkiewne contains the villages and settlements of Czechy Orlańskie, Długi Bród, Dubicze Cerkiewne, Dubicze Tofiłowce, Górny Gród, Grabowiec, Istok, Jagodniki, Jakubowo, Jelonka, Jodłówka, Klakowo, Koryciski, Krągłe, Kraskowszczyzna, Nikiforowszczyzna, Pasieczniki Małe, Piaski, Rutka, Siemiwołoki, Stary Kornin, Starzyna, Werstok, Wiluki, Witowo, Wojnówka, Wygon and Zabagonie.

== Neighbouring gminas ==
Gmina Dubicze Cerkiewne is bordered by the gminas of Czyże, Hajnówka, Kleszczele and Orla. It also borders Belarus.
