= Dasze =

- Village
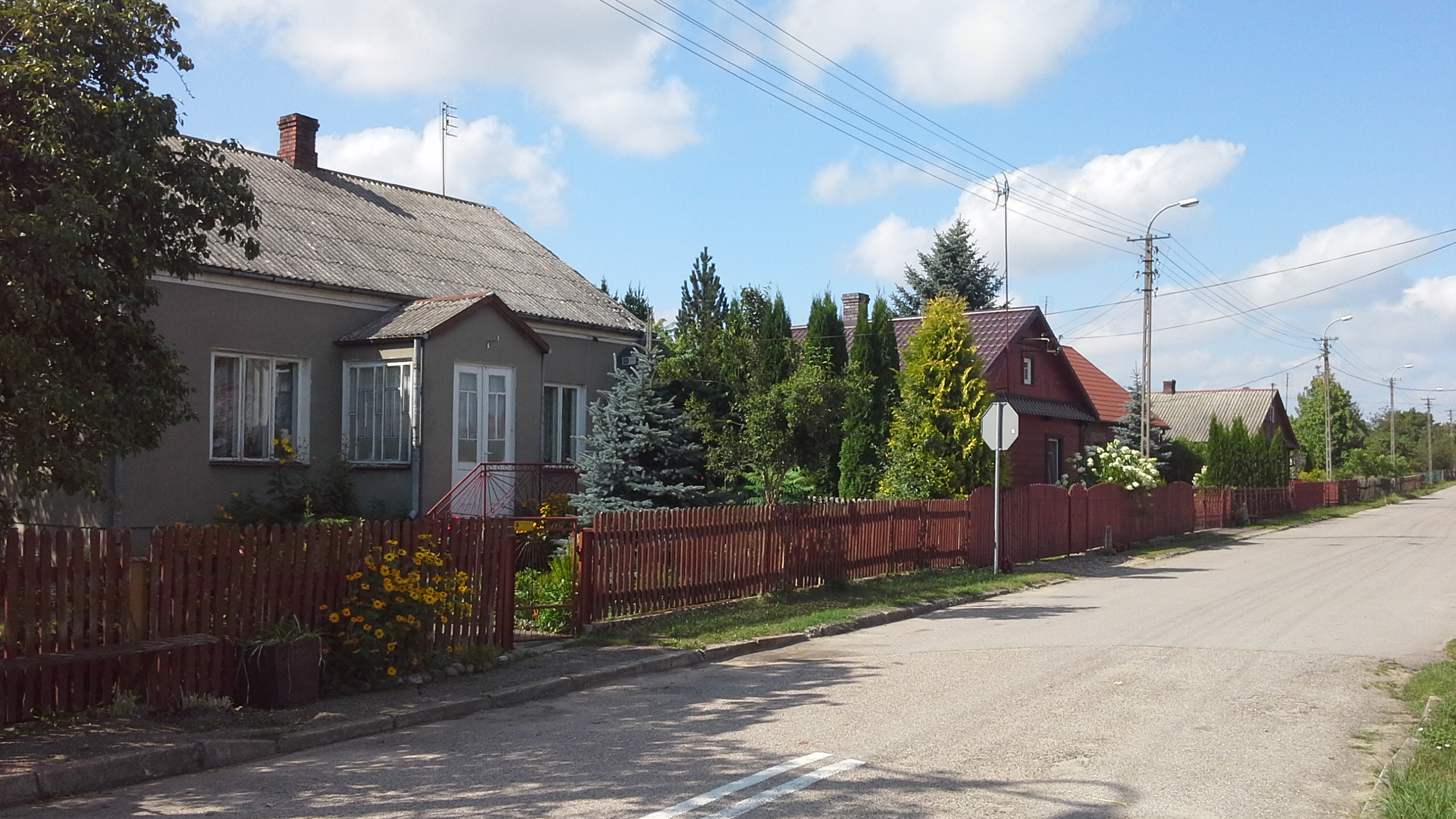

- Location within Poland
- Coordinates: 52°33′N 23°15′E
- Country: Poland
- Voivodeship: Podlaskie
- County: Hajnówka
- Gmina: Kleszczele

Dasze [ˈdaʂɛ] is a village in the administrative district of Gmina Kleszczele, within Hajnówka County, Podlaskie Voivodeship, in north-eastern Poland, close to the border with Belarus.
