= Toporki =

- Village
- Location within Poland
- Coordinates: 52°39′N 23°21′E
- Country: Poland
- Voivodeship: Podlaskie
- County: Hajnówka
- Gmina: Kleszczele

Toporki [tɔˈpɔrki] is a village in the administrative district of Gmina Kleszczele, within Hajnówka County, Podlaskie Voivodeship, in north-eastern Poland, close to the border with Belarus.
