= Jagodniki =

- Village
- Location within Poland
- Coordinates: 52°42′N 23°30′E
- Country: Poland
- Voivodeship: Podlaskie
- County: Hajnówka
- Gmina: Dubicze Cerkiewne
- Population (approx.): 3,000

Jagodniki [jaɡɔdˈniki] is a village in the administrative district of Gmina Dubicze Cerkiewne, within Hajnówka County, Podlaskie Voivodeship, in north-eastern Poland, close to the border with Belarus.
