= Gmina Kleszczele =

Gmina Kleszczele Kleszczele Commune
- Gmina
- Coat of arms
- Interactive map of Gmina Kleszczele
- Coordinates (Kleszczele): 52°34′36″N 23°19′17″E
- Country: Poland
- Voivodeship: Podlaskie
- County: Hajnówka
- Seat: Kleszczele

Area
  - Total: 142.62 km^{2} (55.07 sq mi)

Population (2006)
  - Total: 2,894
  - Density: 20.29/km^{2} (52.56/sq mi)
  - Urban: 1,432
  - Rural: 1,462
- Website: https://www.kleszczele.pl/

Gmina Kleszczele is an urban-rural gmina (administrative district) in Hajnówka County, Podlaskie Voivodeship, in north-eastern Poland, on the border with Belarus. Its seat is the town of Kleszczele, which lies approximately 25 kilometres (16 mi) south-west of Hajnówka and 61 km (38 mi) south of the regional capital Białystok.

The gmina covers an area of 142.62 square kilometres (55.1 sq mi), and as of 2006 its total population is 2,894 (out of which the population of Kleszczele amounts to 1,432, and the population of the rural part of the gmina is 1,462).

== Villages ==
Apart from the town of Kleszczele, Gmina Kleszczele contains the villages and settlements of Biała Straż, Dąbrowa, Dasze, Dobrowoda, Gruzka, Kośna, Kuraszewo, Piotrowszczyzna, Pogreby, Policzna, Repczyce, Rowy, Sad, Saki, Suchowolce, Toporki, Zaleszany and Żuki.

== Neighbouring gminas ==
Gmina Kleszczele is bordered by the gminas of Boćki, Czeremcha, Dubicze Cerkiewne, Milejczyce and Orla. It also borders Belarus.
