= Piotrowszczyzna =

- Village
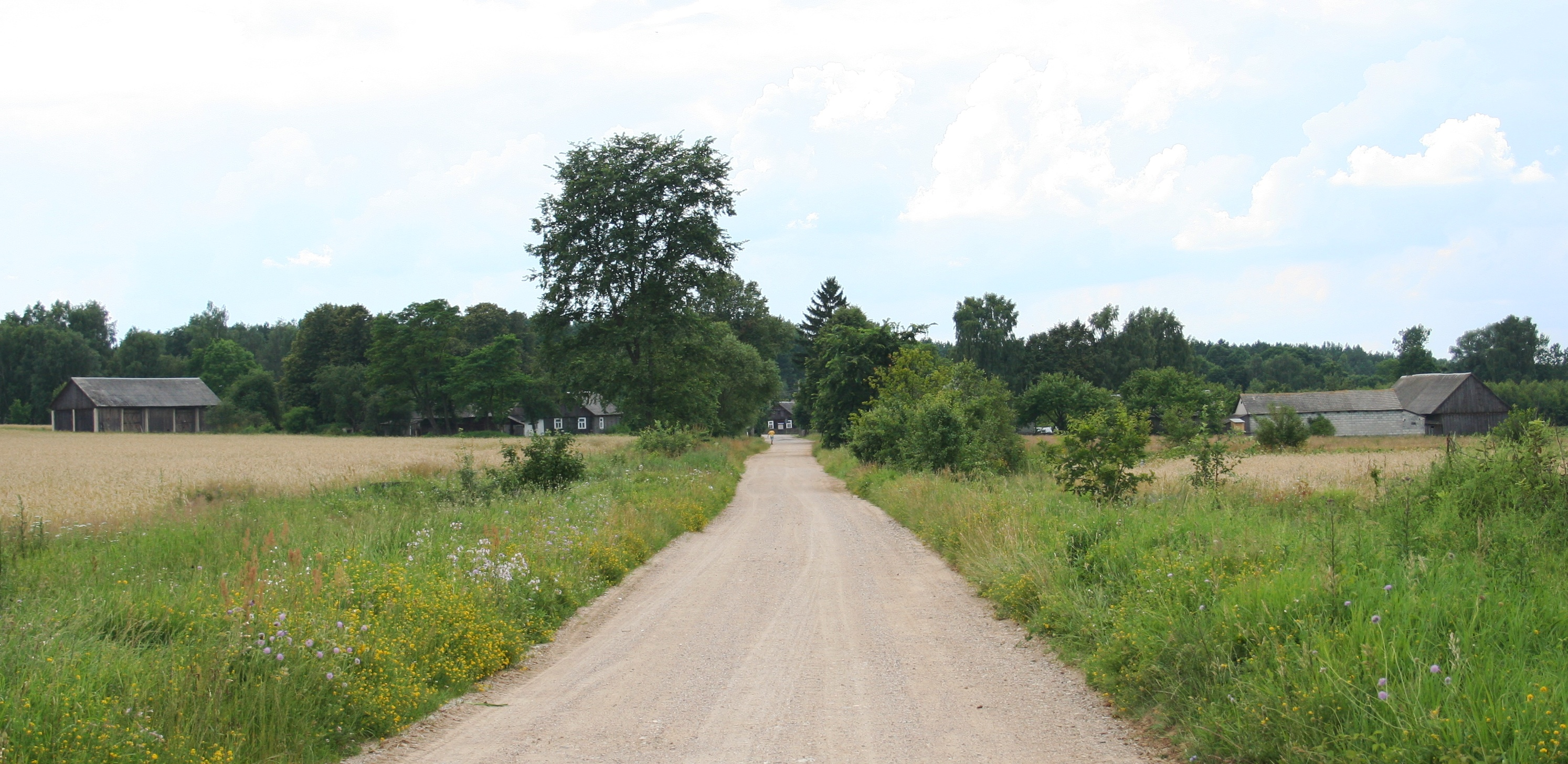

- Location within Poland
- Coordinates: 52°34′N 23°12′E
- Country: Poland
- Voivodeship: Podlaskie
- County: Hajnówka
- Gmina: Kleszczele

Piotrowszczyzna [pjɔtrɔfʂˈt͡ʂɨzna] is a village in the administrative district of Gmina Kleszczele, within Hajnówka County, Podlaskie Voivodeship, in north-eastern Poland, close to the border with Belarus.
