= Długi Bród, Podlaskie Voivodeship =

Długi Bród
- Village
- Location within Poland
- Coordinates: 52°38′N 23°32′E
- Country: Poland
- Voivodeship: Podlaskie
- County: Hajnówka
- Gmina: Dubicze Cerkiewne

Długi Bród [ˈdwuɡʲi ˈbrut] is a village in the administrative district of Gmina Dubicze Cerkiewne, within Hajnówka County, Podlaskie Voivodeship, in north-eastern Poland, close to the border with Belarus.
