= Piaski, Hajnówka County =

Piaski
- Village
- Location within Poland
- Coordinates: 52°38′45″N 23°32′13″E
- Country: Poland
- Voivodeship: Podlaskie
- County: Hajnówka
- Gmina: Dubicze Cerkiewne

Piaski (Polish pronunciation: [ˈpjaskʲi]) is a village in the administrative district of Gmina Dubicze Cerkiewne, within Hajnówka County, Podlaskie Voivodeship, in north-eastern Poland, close to the border with Belarus.
