= Wiluki =

- Village
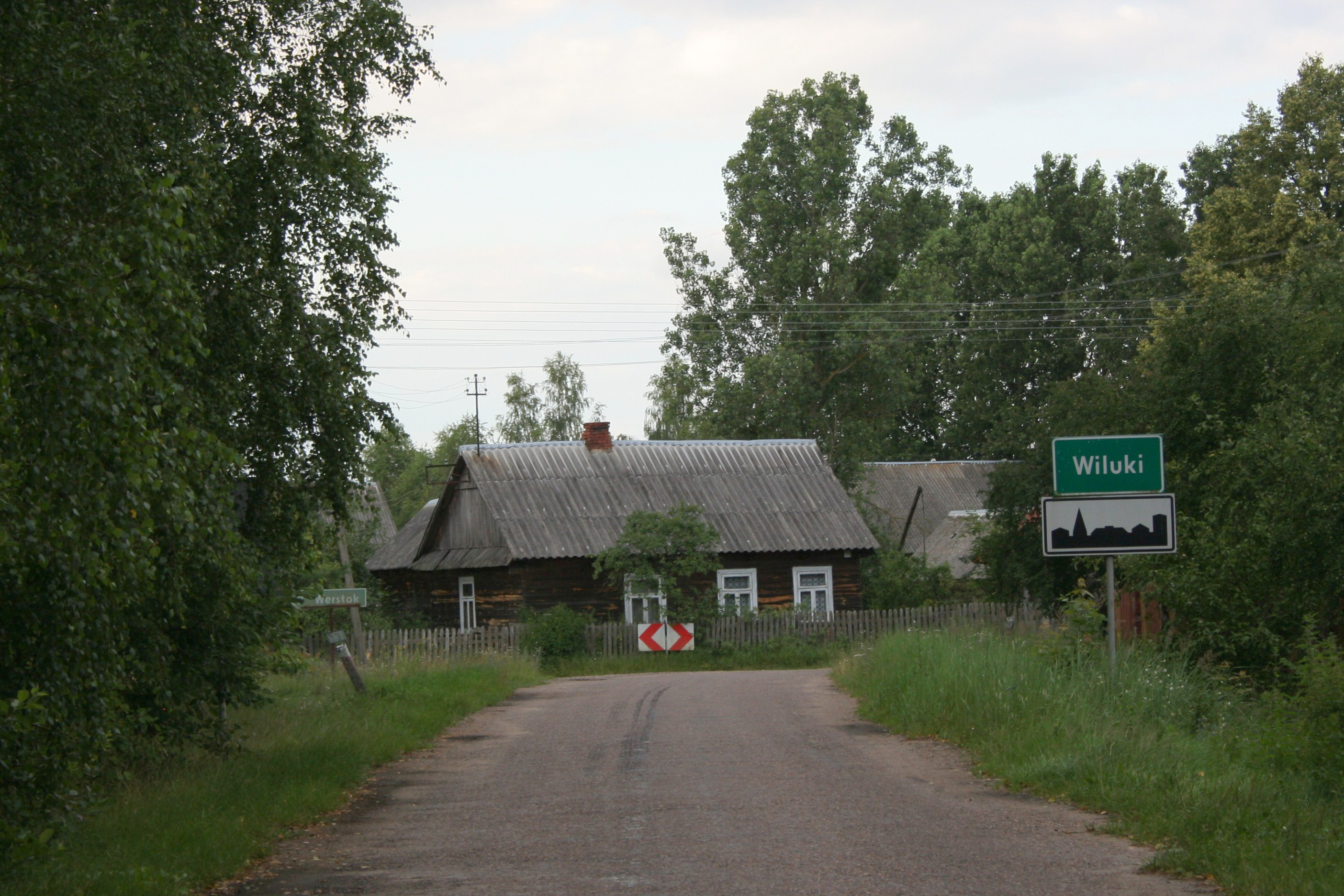

- Location within Poland
- Coordinates: 52°37′N 23°31′E
- Country: Poland
- Voivodeship: Podlaskie
- County: Hajnówka
- Gmina: Dubicze Cerkiewne

Wiluki [vʲiˈlukʲi] is a village in the administrative district of Gmina Dubicze Cerkiewne, within Hajnówka County, Podlaskie Voivodeship, in north-eastern Poland, close to the border with Belarus.
