= Repczyce =

- Village
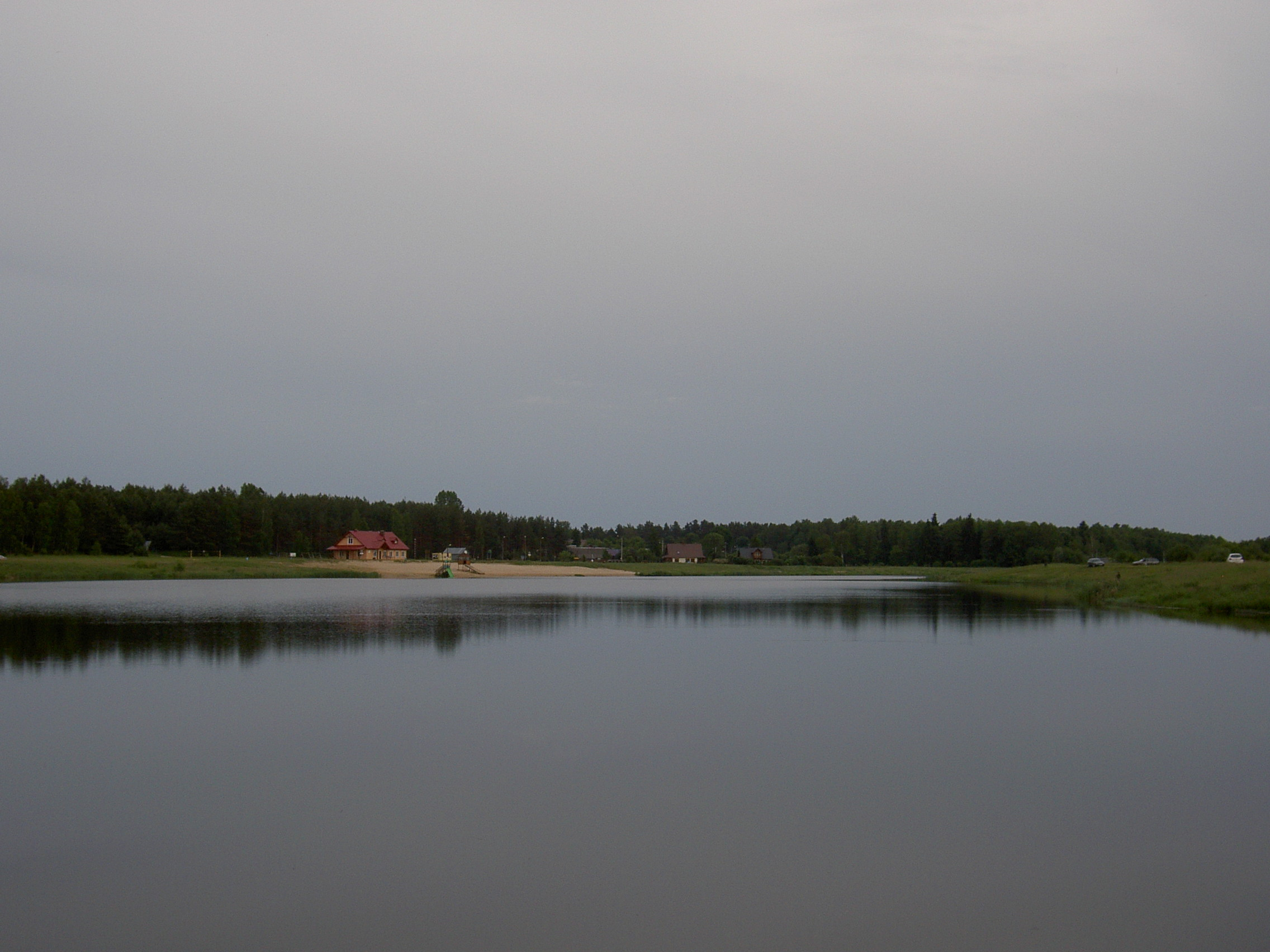

- Location within Poland
- Coordinates: 52°35′30″N 23°16′30″E
- Country: Poland
- Voivodeship: Podlaskie
- County: Hajnówka
- Gmina: Kleszczele

Repczyce [rɛpˈt͡ʂɨt͡sɛ] is a village in the administrative district of Gmina Kleszczele, within Hajnówka County, Podlaskie Voivodeship, in north-eastern Poland, close to the border with Belarus.
