= Żuki, Hajnówka County =

Żuki
- Village
- Location within Poland
- Coordinates: 52°34′20″N 23°14′54″E
- Country: Poland
- Voivodeship: Podlaskie
- County: Hajnówka
- Gmina: Kleszczele

Żuki [ˈʐukʲi] is a village in the administrative district of Gmina Kleszczele, within Hajnówka County, Podlaskie Voivodeship, in north-eastern Poland, close to the border with Belarus.
