= Dąbrowa, Gmina Kleszczele =

Dąbrowa
- Settlement
- Location within Poland
- Coordinates: 52°33′08″N 23°22′09″E
- Country: Poland
- Voivodeship: Podlaskie
- County: Hajnówka
- Gmina: Kleszczele

Dąbrowa [dɔmˈbrɔva] is a settlement in the administrative district of Gmina Kleszczele, within Hajnówka County, Podlaskie Voivodeship, in north-eastern Poland, close to the border with Belarus.
