= Sad, Podlaskie Voivodeship =

Sad
- Village
- Location within Poland
- Coordinates: 52°35′15″N 23°16′45″E
- Country: Poland
- Voivodeship: Podlaskie
- County: Hajnówka
- Gmina: Kleszczele

Sad [sat] is a village in the administrative district of Gmina Kleszczele, within Hajnówka County, Podlaskie Voivodeship, in north-eastern Poland, close to the border with Belarus.
