= Istog (river) =

River in Kosovo

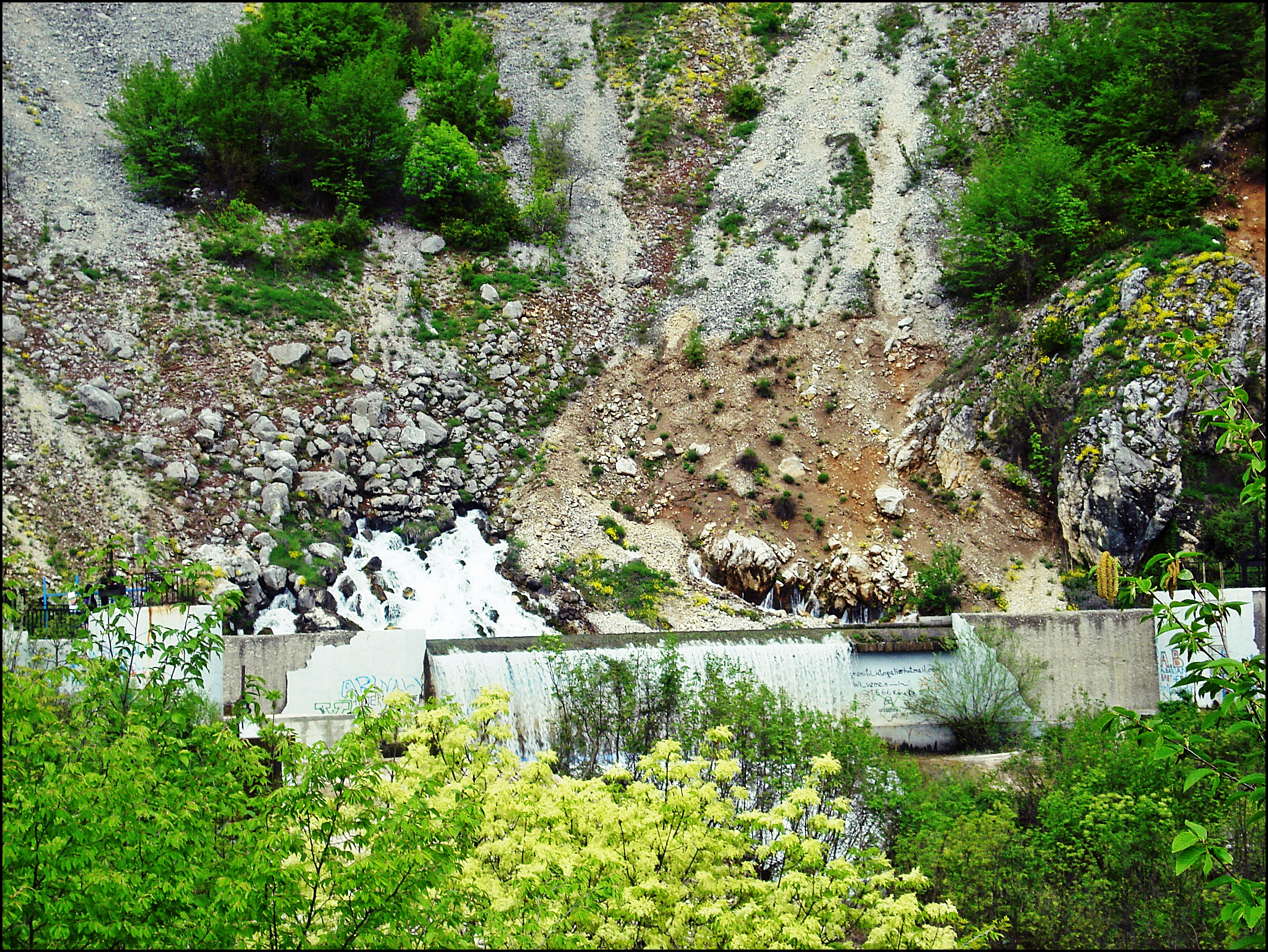
Source in Istog

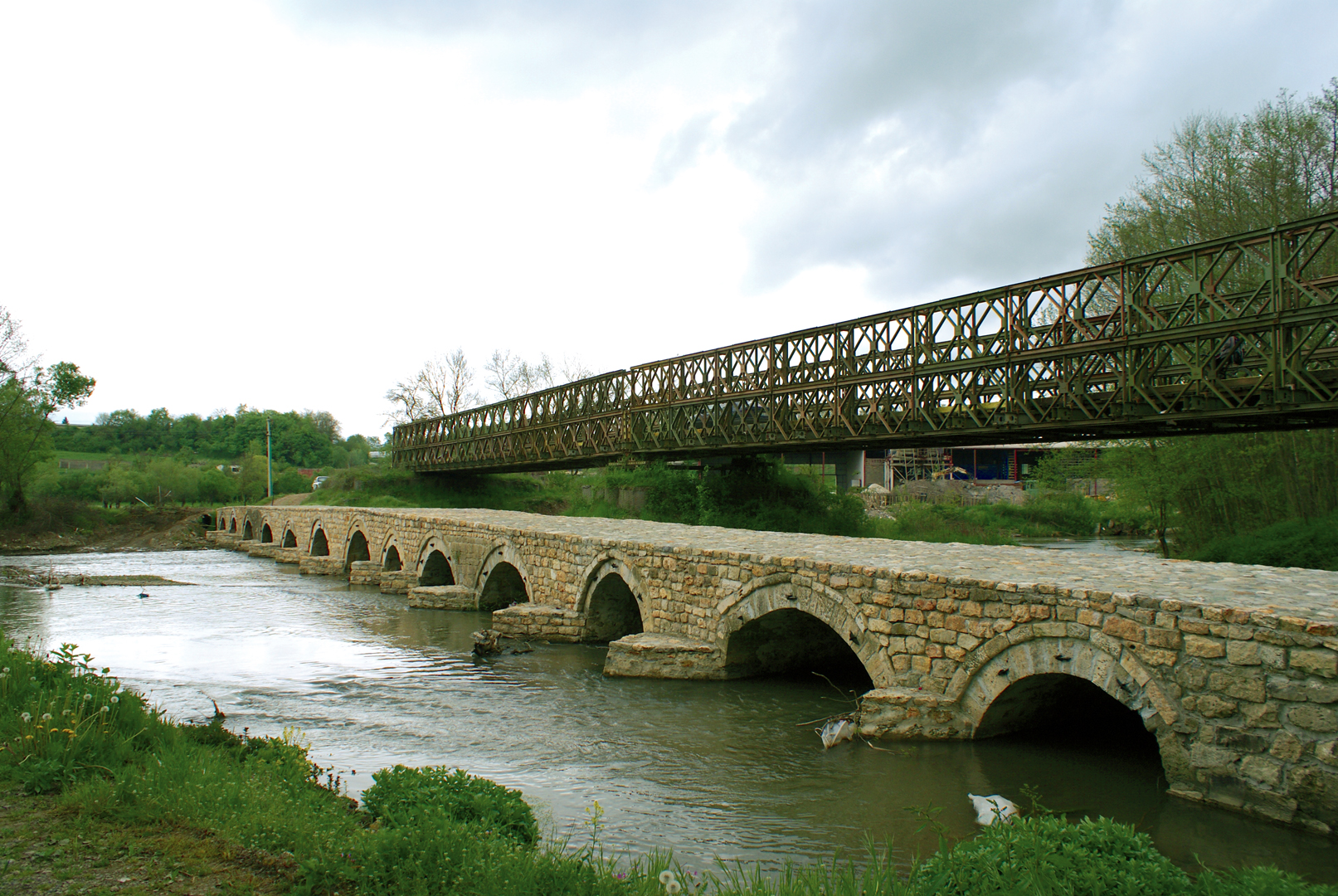
At bridge in Žač

The Istog (Albanian definite form: Istogu) or Istok (Serbian Cyrillic: Исток), is a river originating near the city of Istog, Kosovo, around 560 m in altitude. It is a tributary of the White Drin and joins it near Berkovo, also in Kosovo. The water quality of the 23-km-long river remains, even throughout and is considered the cleanest in the country.
