= Czechy Orlańskie =

- Village
- Location within Poland
- Coordinates: 52°37′34″N 23°26′53″E
- Country: Poland
- Voivodeship: Podlaskie
- County: Hajnówka
- Gmina: Dubicze Cerkiewne

Czechy Orlańskie [ˈt͡ʂɛxɨ ɔrˈlaɲskʲɛ] is a village in the administrative district of Gmina Dubicze Cerkiewne, within Hajnówka County, Podlaskie Voivodeship, in north-eastern Poland, close to the border with Belarus.
