= Kośna, Podlaskie Voivodeship =

Kośna
- Settlement
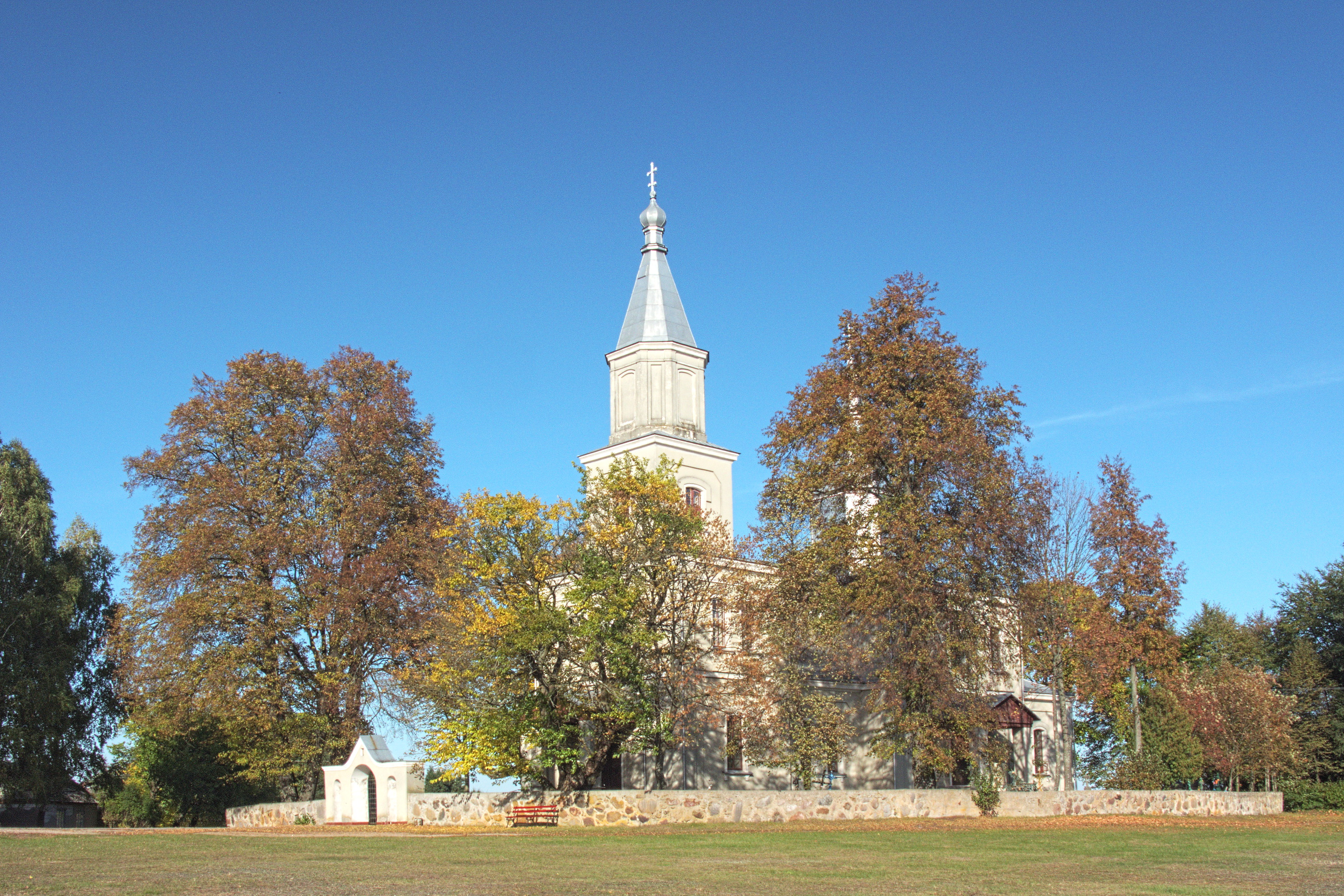

- Location within Poland
- Coordinates: 52°33′46″N 23°15′25″E
- Country: Poland
- Voivodeship: Podlaskie
- County: Hajnówka
- Gmina: Kleszczele

Kośna [ˈkɔɕna] is a settlement in the administrative district of Gmina Kleszczele, within Hajnówka County, Podlaskie Voivodeship, in north-eastern Poland, close to the border with Belarus.
