= Witowo, Podlaskie Voivodeship =

Witowo
- Village
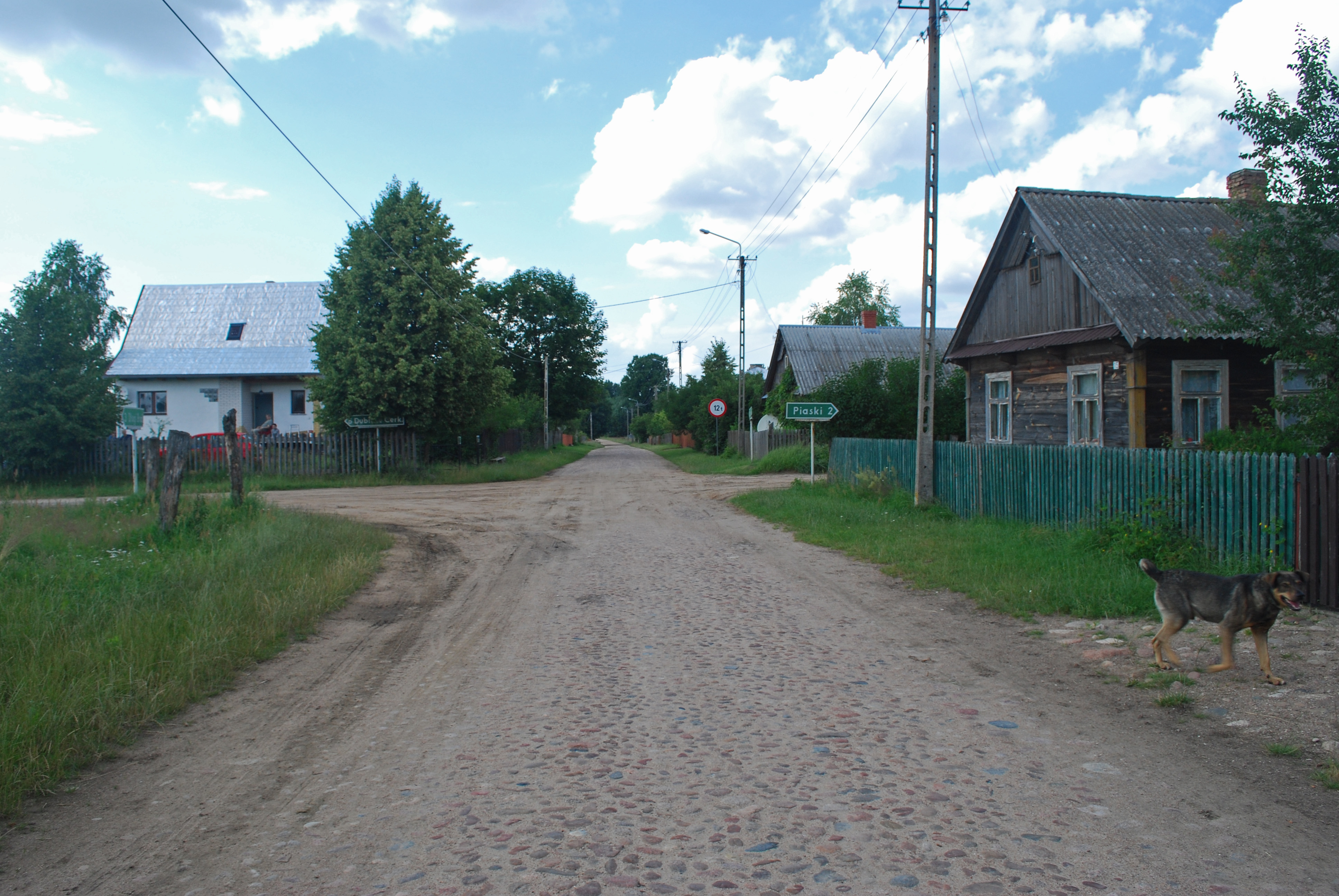

- Location within Poland
- Coordinates: 52°39′N 23°30′E
- Country: Poland
- Voivodeship: Podlaskie
- County: Hajnówka
- Gmina: Dubicze Cerkiewne
- Population: 91 (2021)

Witowo [vʲiˈtɔvɔ] is a village in the administrative district of Gmina Dubicze Cerkiewne, within Hajnówka County, Podlaskie Voivodeship, in north-eastern Poland, close to the border with Belarus.
