= Suchowolce =

- Village
- Location within Poland
- Coordinates: 52°37′N 23°20′E
- Country: Poland
- Voivodeship: Podlaskie
- County: Hajnówka
- Gmina: Kleszczele

Suchowolce [suxɔˈvɔlt͡sɛ] (Belarusian: Сухавольцы, Podlachian: Suchovôlci) is a village in the administrative district of Gmina Kleszczele, within Hajnówka County, Podlaskie Voivodeship, in north-eastern Poland, close to the border with Belarus.
