= Stary Kornin =

- Village
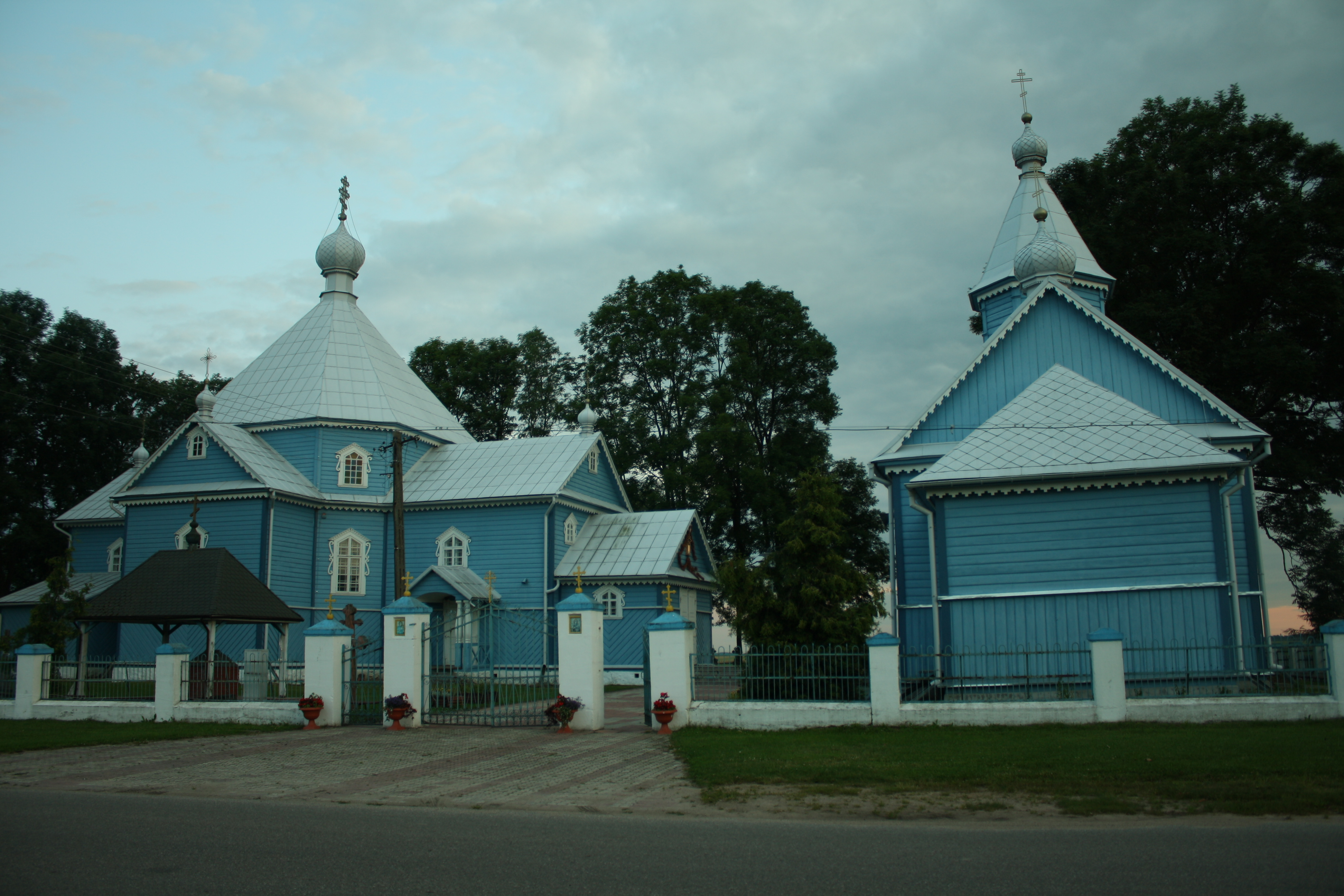

- Location within Poland
- Coordinates: 52°42′N 23°27′E
- Country: Poland
- Voivodeship: Podlaskie
- County: Hajnówka
- Gmina: Dubicze Cerkiewne

Stary Kornin [ˈstarɨ ˈkɔrnin] is a village in the administrative district of Gmina Dubicze Cerkiewne, within Hajnówka County, Podlaskie Voivodeship, in north-eastern Poland, close to the border with Belarus.

According to the 1921 census, the village was inhabited by 245 people, among whom 4 were Roman Catholic, 225 Orthodox, and 16 Mosaic. At the same time, 13 inhabitants declared Polish nationality, 224 Belarusian,1 Jewish and 1 another. There were 60 residential buildings in the village.
