= Dubicze Cerkiewne =

- Village
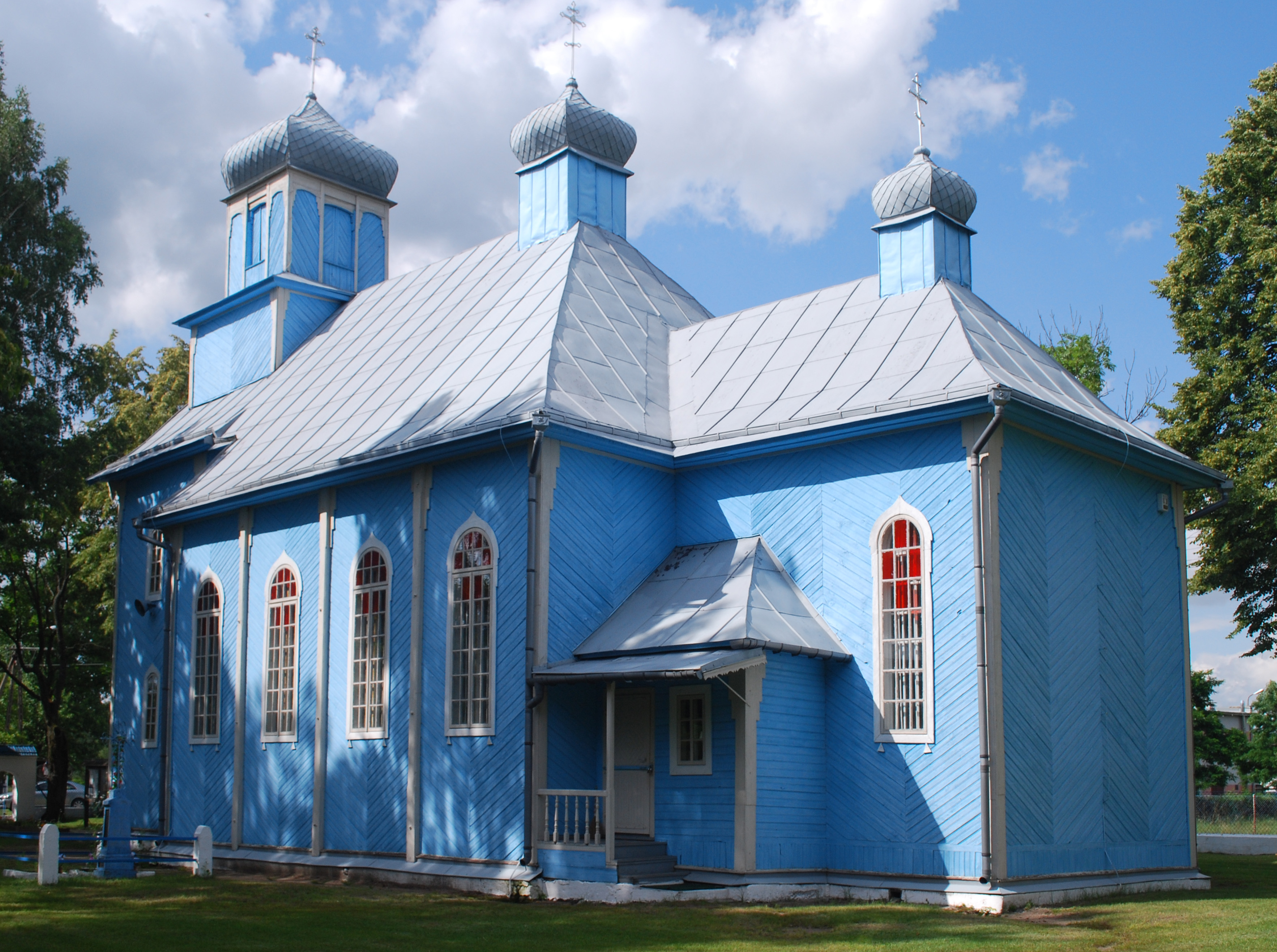
- Orthodox church

- Location within Poland
- Coordinates: 52°39′N 23°26′E
- Country: Poland
- Voivodeship: Podlaskie
- County: Hajnówka
- Gmina: Dubicze Cerkiewne
- Population: 1,900

Dubicze Cerkiewne (Polish: [duˈbʲit͡ʂɛ t͡sɛrˈkʲɛvnɛ]; Belarusian: Дубічы Царкоўныя, romanized: Dubičy Carkoŭnyja; Ukrainian: Дубичі Церковні; Podlachian: Dúbičy Cerkóvny) is a village in Hajnówka County, Podlaskie Voivodeship, in north-eastern Poland, close to the border with Belarus. It is the seat of the gmina (administrative district) called Gmina Dubicze Cerkiewne.
