= Zallçi =

Zallçi: Zallç (Albanian); Жач/Žač (Serbian)
- Location within Kosovo
- Coordinates: 42°42′23″N 20°30′06″E
- Location: Kosovo
- District: Peja
- Municipality: Burim

Population (2024)
  - Total: 459

Zallçi or Žač (Serbian Cyrillic: Жач) is a village/settlement in the Burim Municipality of Kosovo. Zallç has 502 inhabitants, of whom 267 are Albanians and 235 are Ashkalis or Balkan Egyptians. The village was in the spotlight in 2010, when Serbian refugees were denied the right to return to their homes.

== Population ==
Ethnic Composition, Including IDPs
Year/Population	Albanians	%	Serbs	%	Montenegrins	%	Muslims (by ethnicity)	%	others	%	Total
1961	287	41.72%	243	35.32%	158	22.97%	0	0.00%	0	0.00%	688
1971	405	51.59%	254	32.36%	115	14.65%	0	0.00%	11	1.40%	785
1981	251	29.05%	191	22.11%	81	9.38%	327	37.85%	14	1.62%	864
1991	1	0.19%	147	27.79%	52	9.83%	307	58.03%	22	4.16%	529

Albanians boycotted the census in 1991, so their numbers for that year are not known.
