= Istok, Velikoustyugsky District, Vologda Oblast =

Istok Исток
- Village
- Location within Vologda Oblast Location within Russia
- Coordinates: 60°27′N 46°31′E
- Country: Russia
- Region: Vologda Oblast
- District: Velikoustyugsky District
- Time zone: UTC+3:00

Istok (Russian: Исток) is a rural locality (a village) in Orlovskoye Rural Settlement, Velikoustyugsky District, Vologda Oblast, Russia. The population was 1 as of 2002.

== Geography ==
The distance to Veliky Ustyug is 76 km, to Chernevo is 8 km. Arkhangelskaya Melnitsa is the nearest rural locality.
