= Krasny Istok =

Krasny Istok Красный Исток
- Village
- Location within Amur Oblast Location within Russia
- Coordinates: 49°16′59″N 130°02′15″E
- Country: Russia
- Region: Amur Oblast
- District: Arkharinsky District
- Time zone: UTC+9:00

Krasny Istok (Russian: Красный Исток) is a rural locality (a selo) in Leninsky Selsoviet of Arkharinsky District, Amur Oblast, Russia. The population was 53 in 2018. There are 3 streets.

== Geography ==
Krasny Istok is located 23 km south of Arkhara (the district's administrative centre) by road. Orlovka is the nearest rural locality.
