= Wygon, Gmina Dubicze Cerkiewne =

Wygon
- Village
- Location within Poland
- Coordinates: 52°36′30″N 23°31′30″E
- Country: Poland
- Voivodeship: Podlaskie
- County: Hajnówka
- Gmina: Dubicze Cerkiewne
- Population: 3

Wygon [ˈvɨɡɔn] is a village in the administrative district of Gmina Dubicze Cerkiewne, within Hajnówka County, Podlaskie Voivodeship, in north-eastern Poland, close to the border with Belarus.As of a 2021 consensus, the population was 3.
