= Istok, Kabansky District, Republic of Buryatia =

Istok Исток
- Selo
- Location within Republic of Buryatia Location within Russia
- Coordinates: 52°05′N 106°15′E
- Country: Russia
- Region: Republic of Buryatia
- District: Kabansky District
- Time zone: UTC+8:00

Istok (Russian: Исток) is a rural locality (a selo) in Kabansky District, Republic of Buryatia, Russia. The population was 262 as of 2010. There are 6 streets.

== Geography ==
Istok is located 39 km northwest of Kabansk (the district's administrative centre) by road. Istomino is the nearest rural locality.
