= Istok, Gmina Dubicze Cerkiewne =

Istok
- Village
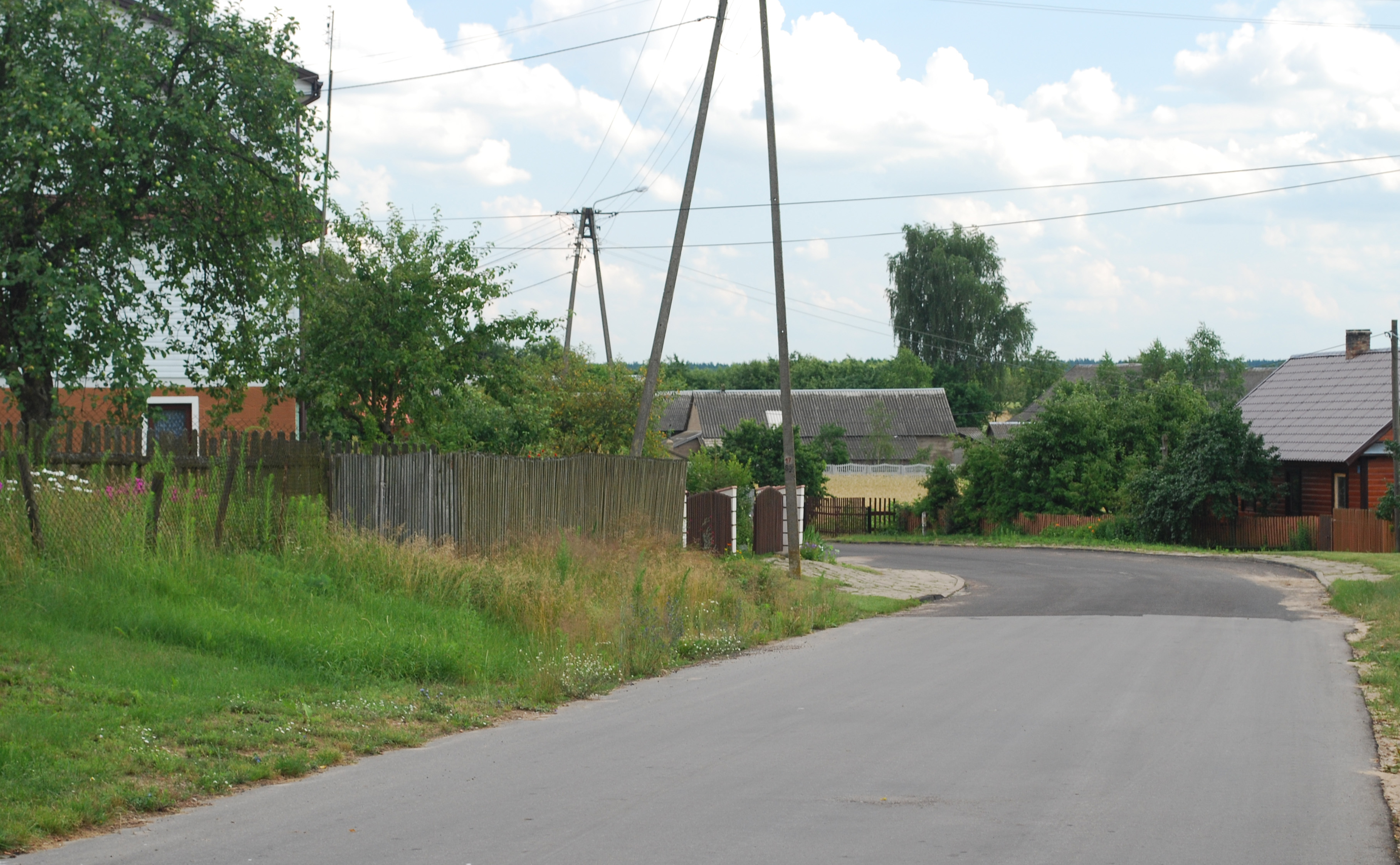
- Houses by the road in Istok

- Location within Poland
- Coordinates: 52°39′51″N 23°28′58″E
- Country: Poland
- Voivodeship: Podlaskie
- County: Hajnówka
- Gmina: Dubicze Cerkiewne
- Population: 130

Istok [ˈistɔk] is a village in the administrative district of Gmina Dubicze Cerkiewne, within Hajnówka County, Podlaskie Voivodeship, in north-eastern Poland, close to the border with Belarus.

== History ==
According to the official website of the Gmina Dubicze Cerkiewne, the village of Istok was established before 1570. The name "Istok" is believed to be derived from local words meaning “slope” or “small stream” (i.e., a spring or minor watercourse) in the Mazovian/Podlaskie dialect.
