= Istok, Perm Krai =

Istok Исток
- Village
- Location within Perm Krai Location within Russia
- Coordinates: 60°05′N 56°15′E
- Country: Russia
- Region: Perm Krai
- District: Cherdynsky District
- Time zone: UTC+5:00

Istok (Russian: Исток) is a rural locality (a village) in Cherdynsky District, Perm Krai, Russia. The population was 13 as of 2010. There are 2 streets.

== Geography ==
Istok is located 116 km southwest of Cherdyn (the district's administrative centre) by road. Koepty is the nearest rural locality.
