= Bolshoy Istok =

Bolshoy Istok Большой Исток
- Village
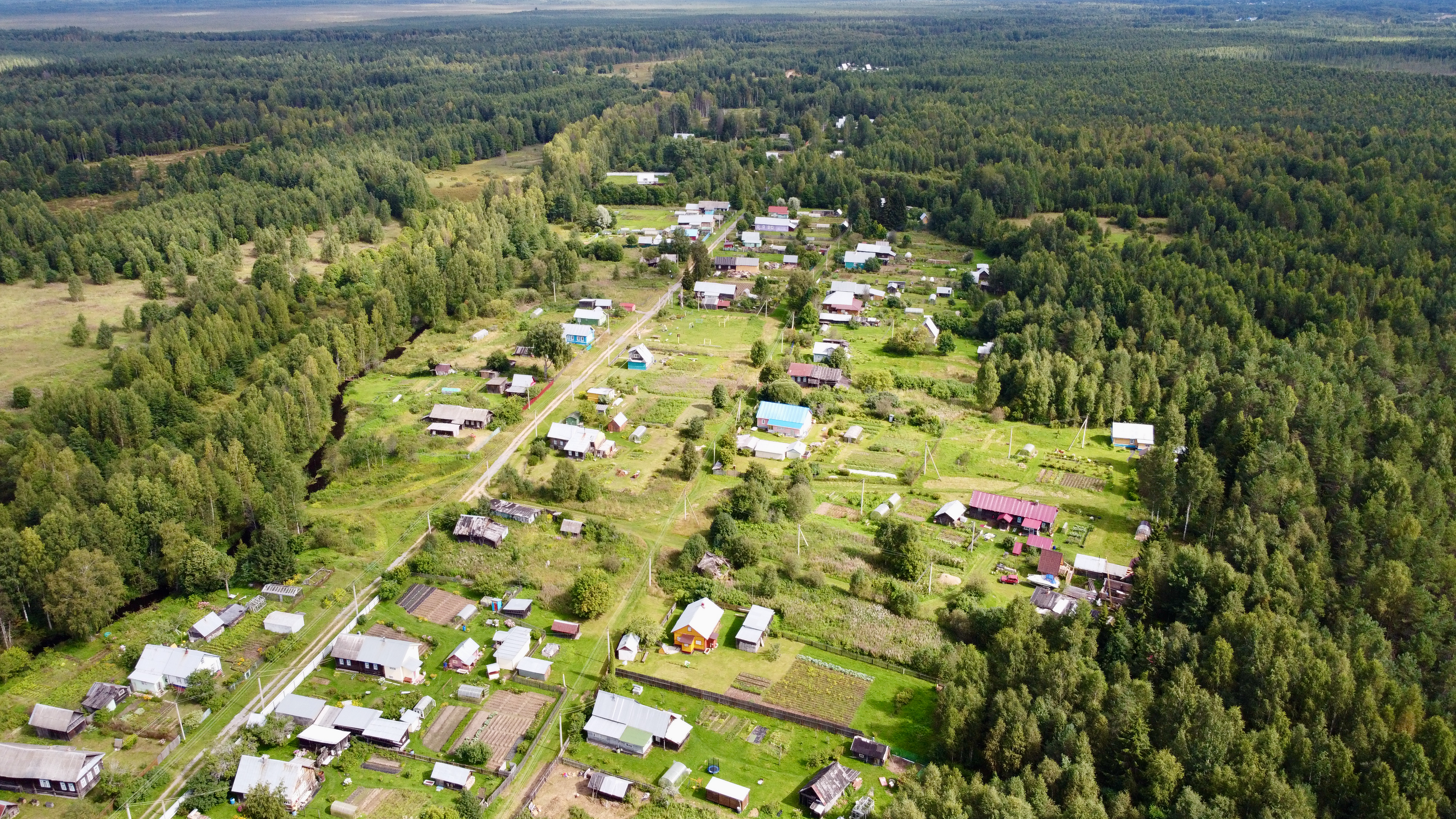

- Location within Vologda Oblast Location within Russia
- Coordinates: 59°06′N 37°29′E
- Country: Russia
- Region: Vologda Oblast
- District: Cherepovetsky District
- Time zone: UTC+3:00

Bolshoy Istok (Russian: Большой Исток) is a rural locality (a village) in Sudskoye Rural Settlement, Cherepovetsky District, Vologda Oblast, Russia. The population was 11 as of 2002.

== Geography ==
Bolshoy Istok is located 46 km (29 mi) west of Cherepovets (the district's administrative centre) by road. Maly Istok is the nearest rural locality.
