= Grabowiec, Hajnówka County =

Grabowiec
- Village
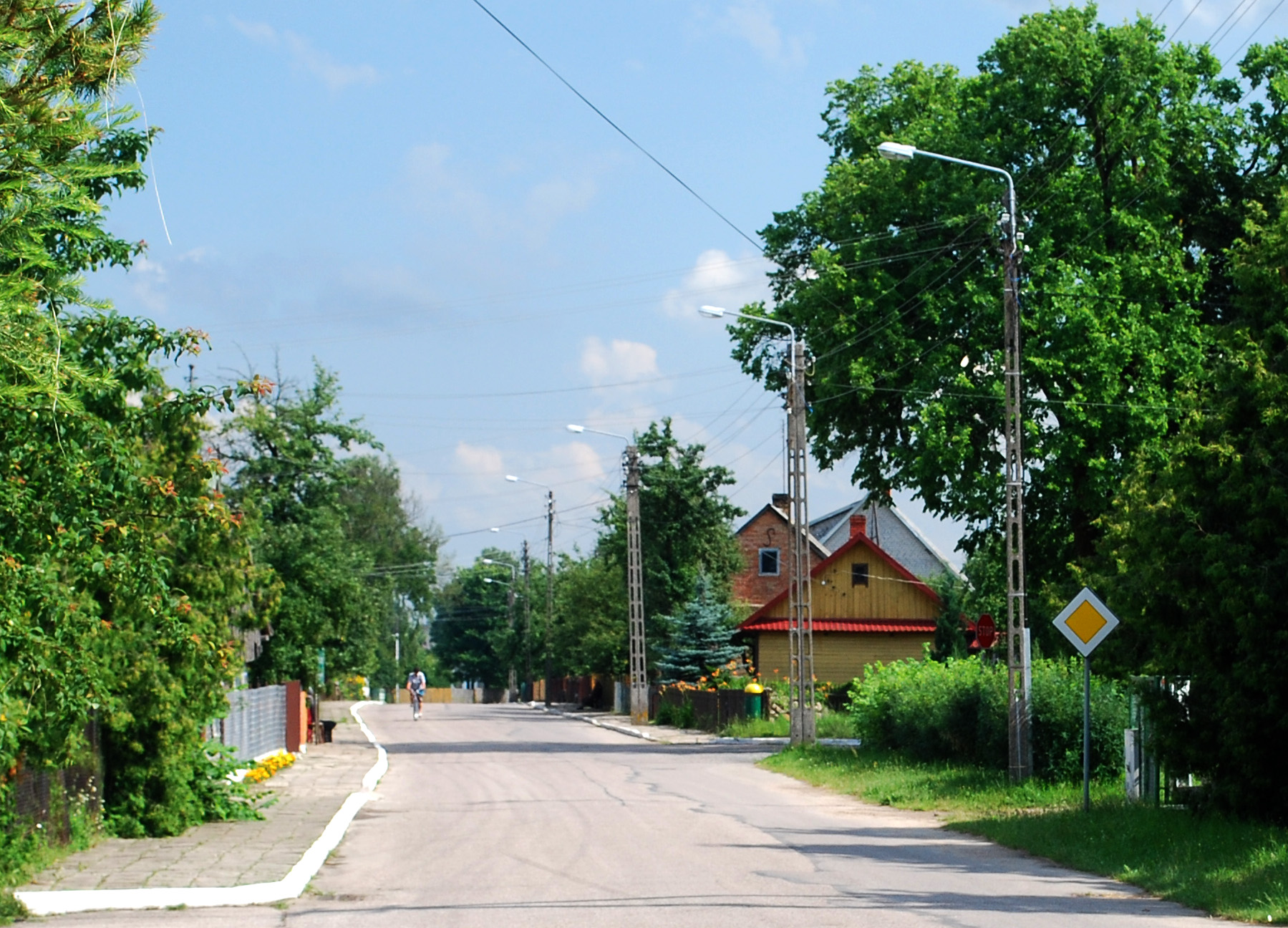

- Location within Poland
- Coordinates: 52°38′N 23°25′E
- Country: Poland
- Voivodeship: Podlaskie
- County: Hajnówka
- Gmina: Dubicze Cerkiewne

Grabowiec [ɡraˈbɔvʲɛt͡s] is a village in the administrative district of Gmina Dubicze Cerkiewne, within Hajnówka County, Podlaskie Voivodeship, in north-eastern Poland, close to the border with Belarus.

Herman Szymaniuk was born in Grabowiec. He was a Belarusian partisan and communist activist, as well as co-organizer of the Brotherhood of Belarusian Peasants.
