= Iztok =

Iztok is a Slovene masculine given name. Notable people with the name include:

- Iztok Božič, a former professional tennis player from Slovenia
- Iztok Čop, a Slovenian rower and Olympic gold medalist
- Iztok Geister, a Slovene writer, poet, essayist and ornithologist
- Iztok Jarc, a Slovenian diplomat and politician
- Iztok Kapušin, a Slovenian football manager and former player
- Iztok Mlakar, a Slovenian singer-songwriter and theatre actor
- Iztok Osojnik, a Slovene poet and essayist
- Iztok Puc, a Croatian-Slovenian handball player
- Iztok Utroša, a Slovenian badminton player

== See also ==
- HD 146389, an F-type star which is known to host one exoplanet, designated WASP-38b or formally named 'Iztok'
