= Dobrowoda, Hajnówka County =

Dobrowoda
- Village
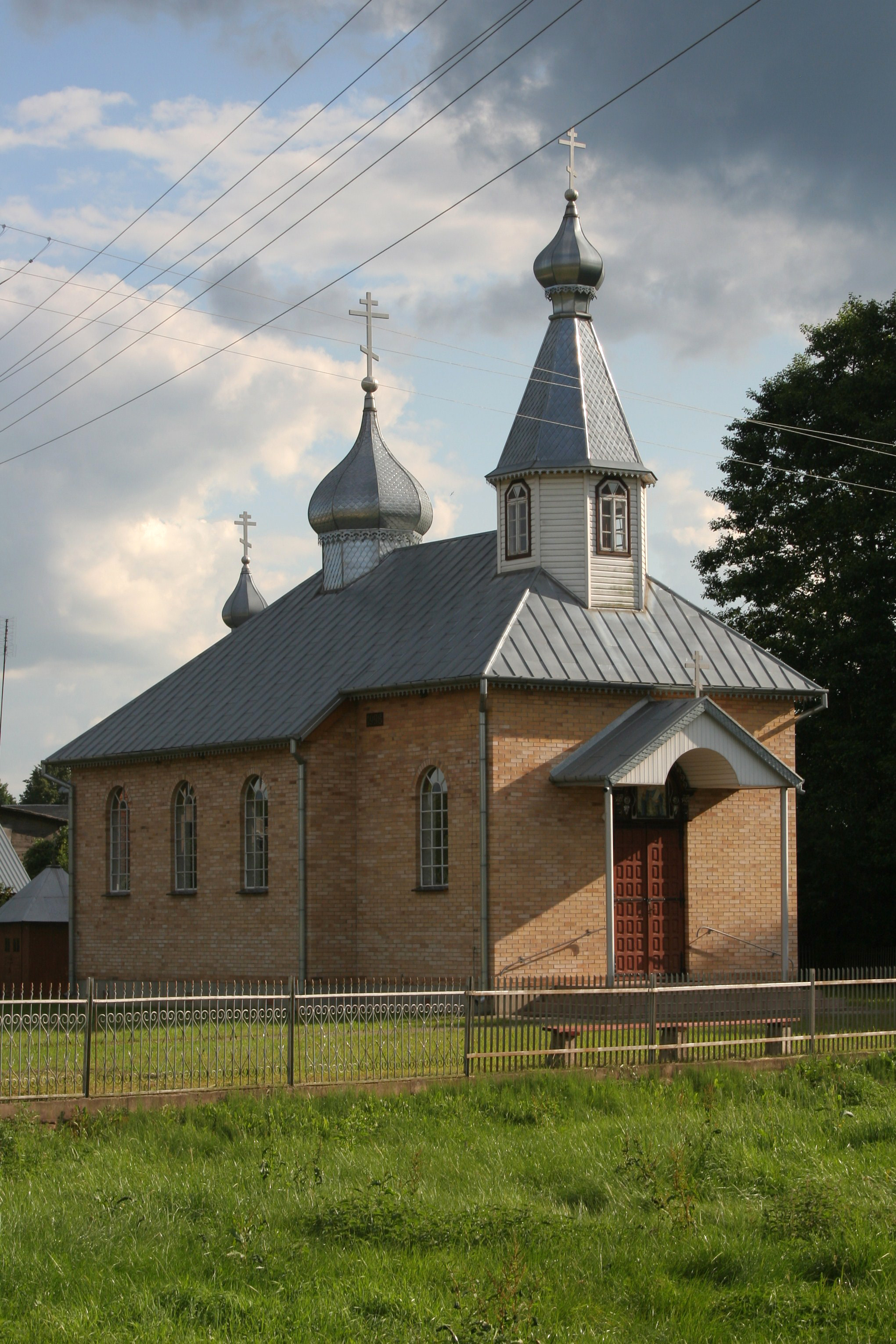
- Saint Paraskevi Orthodox Church

- Location within Poland
- Coordinates: 52°33′N 23°22′E
- Country: Poland
- Voivodeship: Podlaskie
- County: Hajnówka
- Gmina: Kleszczele

Dobrowoda [dɔbrɔˈvɔda] is a village in the administrative district of Gmina Kleszczele, within Hajnówka County, Podlaskie Voivodeship, in north-eastern Poland, close to the border with Belarus.

According to the 1921 census, the village was inhabited by 297 people, among whom 1 were Roman Catholic, 293 Orthodox, and 3 Mosaic. At the same time, 296 inhabitants declared Polish nationality, 1 Belarusian. There were 70 residential buildings in the village.
