= Istok, Pribaykalsky District, Republic of Buryatia =

Istok Исток
- Settlement
- Location within Republic of Buryatia Location within Russia
- Coordinates: 52°51′N 108°12′E
- Country: Russia
- Region: Republic of Buryatia
- District: Pribaykalsky District
- Time zone: UTC+8:00

Istok (Russian: Исток) is a rural locality (a settlement) in Pribaykalsky District, Republic of Buryatia, Russia. The population was 142 as of 2010. There are 4 streets.

== Geography ==
Istok is located 110 km northeast of Turuntayevo (the district's administrative centre) by road. Turka is the nearest rural locality.
