= Krągłe, Podlaskie Voivodeship =

Krągłe
- Settlement
- Location within Poland
- Coordinates: 52°36′37″N 23°32′54″E
- Country: Poland
- Voivodeship: Podlaskie
- County: Hajnówka
- Gmina: Dubicze Cerkiewne

Krągłe [ˈkrɔnɡwɛ] is a settlement in the administrative district of Gmina Dubicze Cerkiewne, within Hajnówka County, Podlaskie Voivodeship, in north-eastern Poland, close to the border with Belarus.
