= Kleszczele =

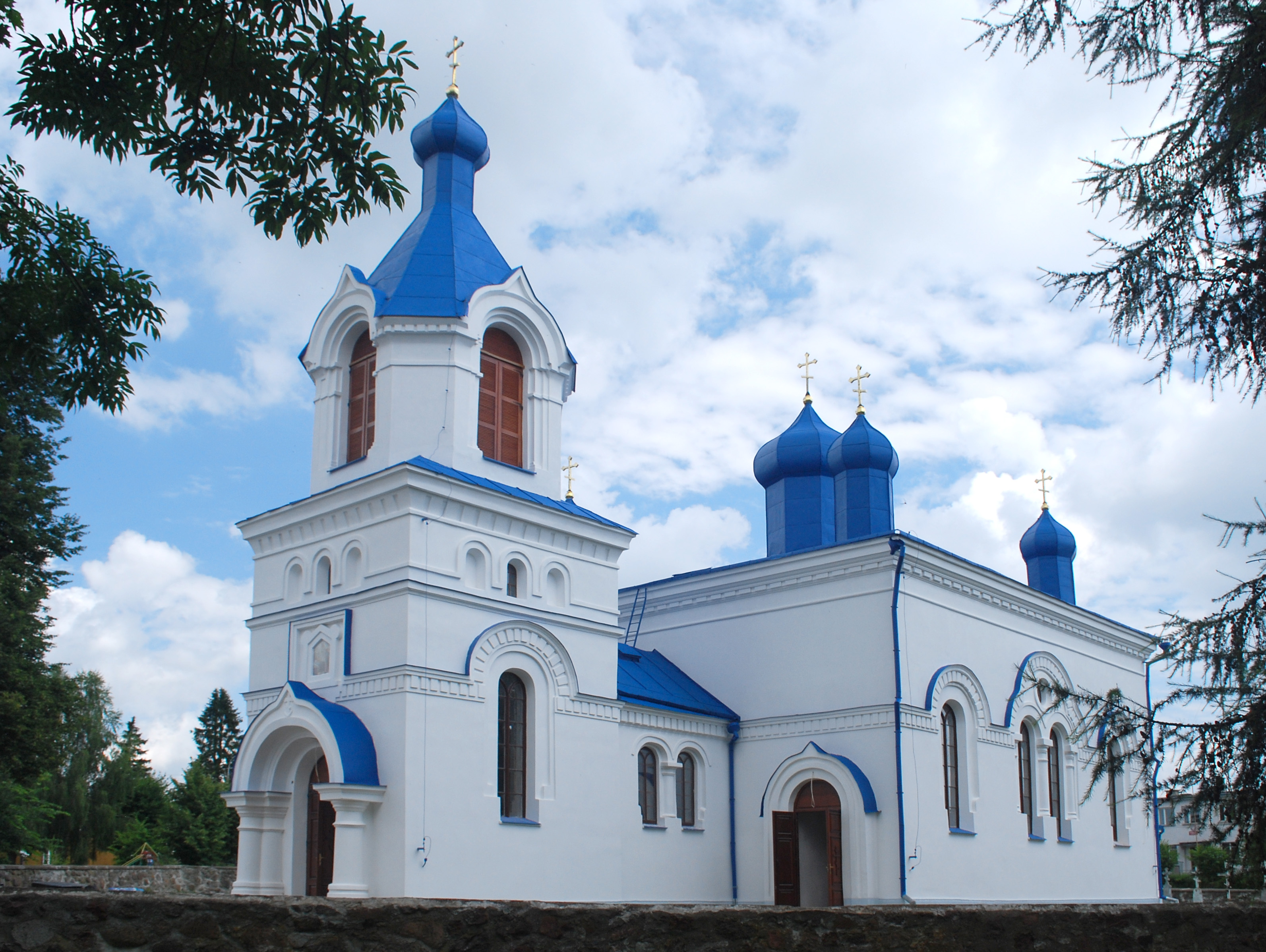
- Orthodox Church of the Dormition

- Coat of arms

- Location within Poland
- Coordinates: 52°34′28″N 23°19′34″E
- Country: Poland
- Voivodeship: Podlaskie
- County: Hajnówka
- Gmina: Kleszczele
- Town rights: 1523

Area
  - Total: 46.71 km^{2} (18.03 sq mi)

Population (2006)
  - Total: 1,432
  - Density: 30.66/km^{2} (79.40/sq mi)
- Time zone: UTC+1 (CET)
  - Summer (DST): UTC+2 (CEST)
- Postal code: 17-250
- Vehicle registration: BHA
- Website: https://www.kleszczele.pl/

Kleszczele [klɛʂˈt͡ʂɛlɛ] (Note: Belarusian: Кляшчэ́лі, romanized: Klaščeli, Podlachian: Kliščéli) is a town in Hajnówka County, Podlaskie Voivodeship, eastern Poland.

== History ==
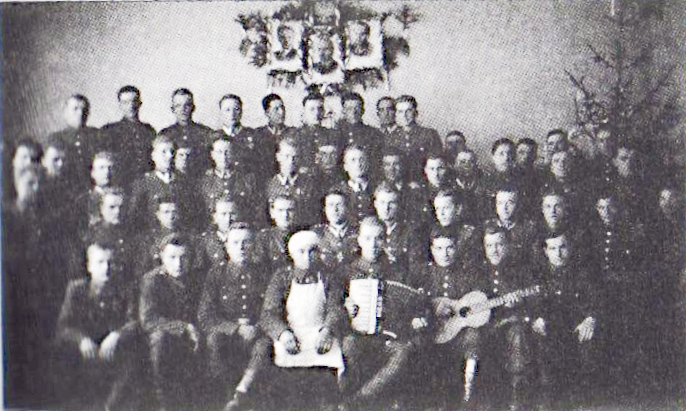
Polish Border Protection Forces in Kleszczele, c. 1947

Kleszczele was granted town rights by King Sigismund I the Old in 1523. It was a royal town of Poland. Queen consort Bona Sforza founded a Catholic church in 1544. In 1578, King Stephen Bathory issued a privilege regarding salt trade. His wife, Queen consort Anna Jagiellon administered the town. The townspeople prospered off of growing and selling hops to Królewiec.

During World War I, the town was occupied by Germany. In the interwar period, it was administratively located in the Bielsk County in the Białystok Voivodeship of Poland.

Following the invasion of Poland, which started World War II in September 1939, it was first occupied by the Soviet Union until 1941, then by Nazi Germany until 1944. After the war, it was administratively located in the "large" and then "small" Białystok Voivodeship until 1998.

== Demography ==
Historical population

Year	Pop.	±%
1880	1,750	—
1890	1,900	+8.6%
1897	2,013	+5.9%
1921	1,452	−27.9%

Year	Pop.	±%
1931	2,029	+39.7%
1939	2,200	+8.4%
1946	1,436	−34.7%
2010	1,388	−3.3%

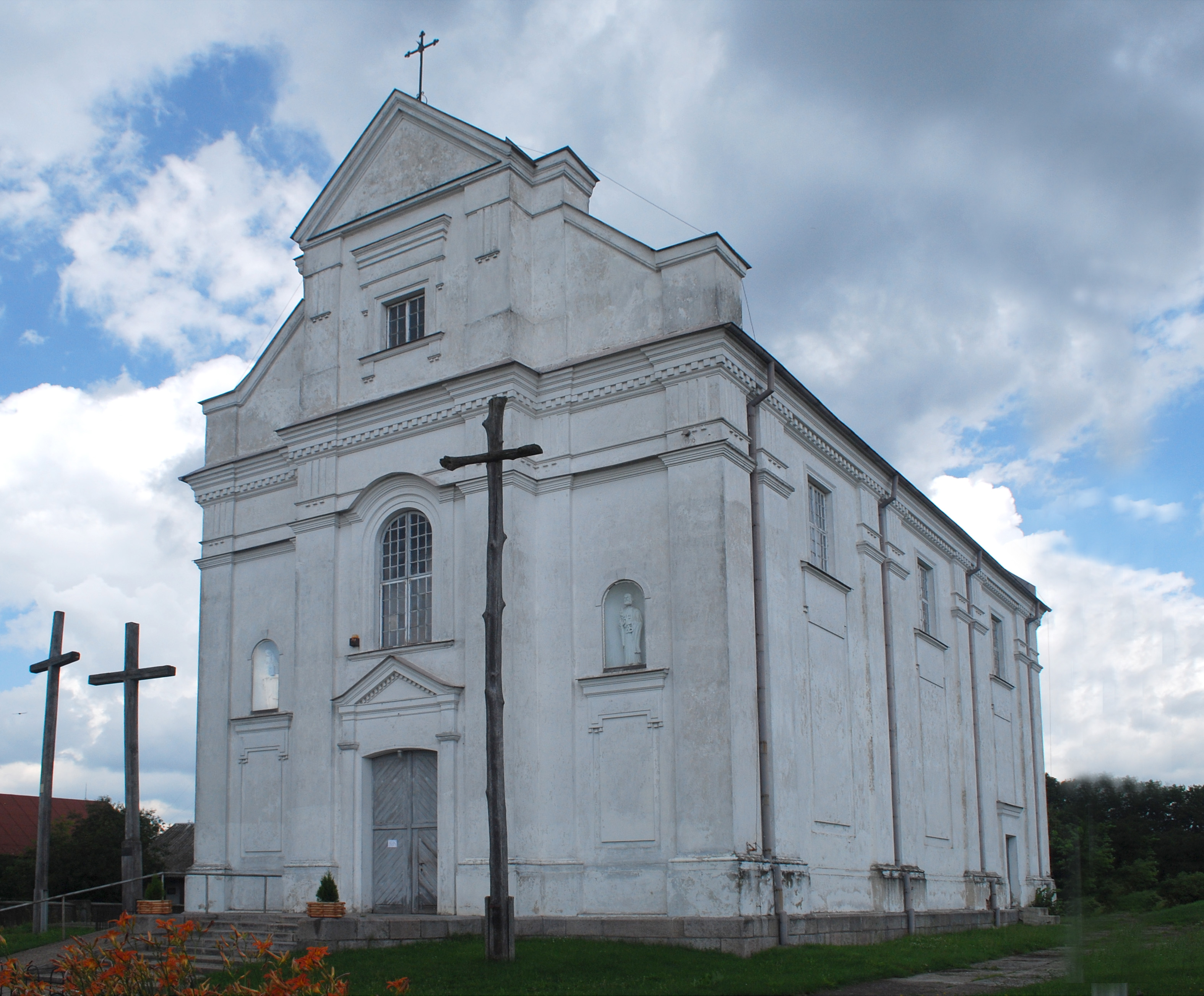
Saint Sigismund Catholic Church

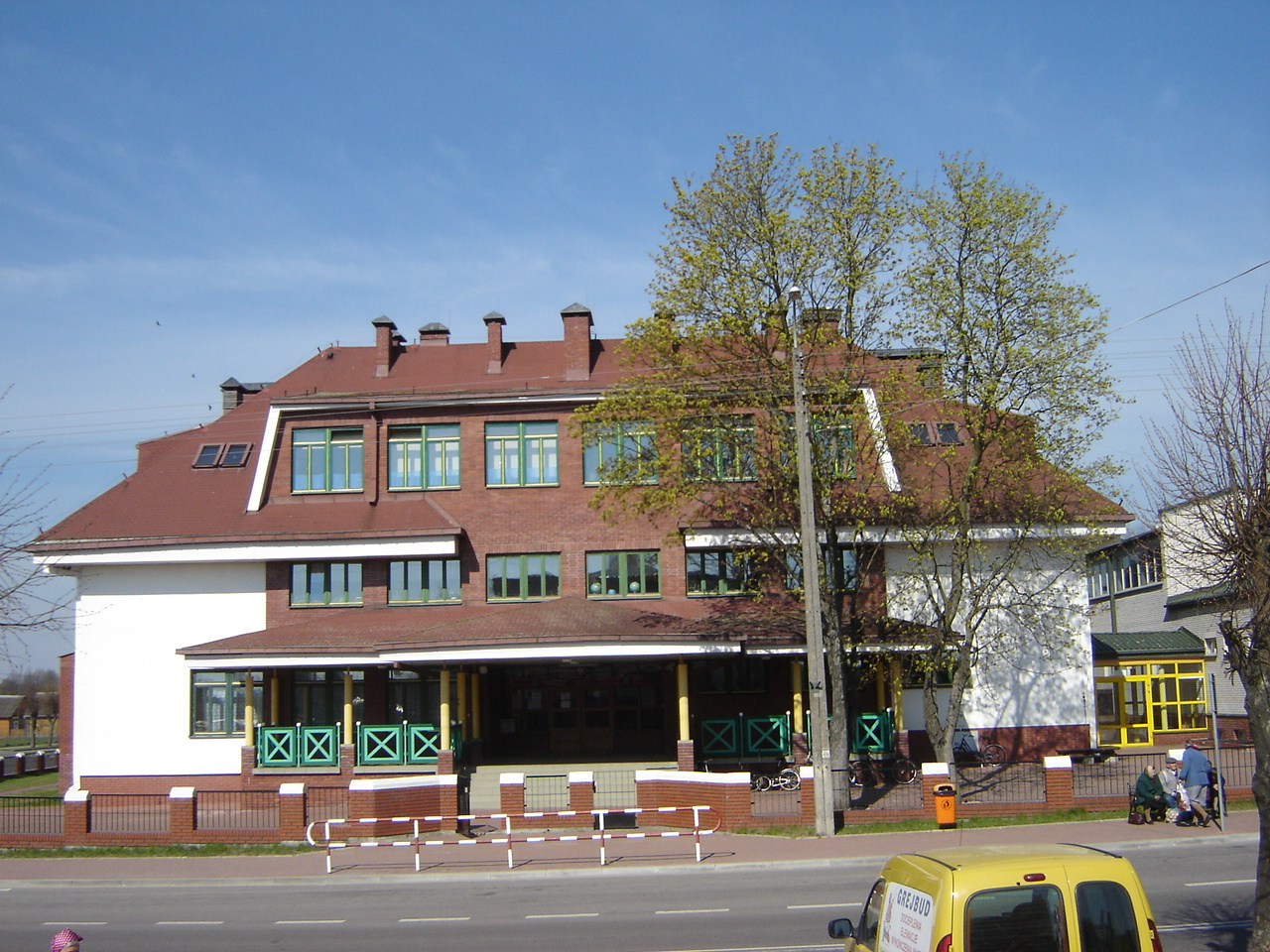
Elementary school in Kleszczele

According to the 1921 census, Kleszczele was inhabited by:

Nationality	Population	Proportion
Poles	911	62.7%
Belarusians	349	24%
Jews	147	10.1%
Russians	45	3%
Total	1452	100.00%

=== Jews ===
Already in the 16th century, Izaac Brodawka from Brześć Litewski received a royal privilege to build a brewery in Kleszczele. Since then, there has been a small Jewish community here, but it did not form a formal Qahal. In 1674, 13 Jews paid the "pogórki" register here. In 1688, the townspeople of Kleszczele obtained a privilege prohibiting Jews from living in the city "de non tolerandis judaeis". From that time until the partitions of Poland, there were no Jews in Kleszczele. The census of 1799 showed 58 Jews out of 1888 residents, and in 1807 there were 75. According to the census of 1847, there were only 6 Jews, but this may have been a mistake. In 1878, there were 435 Jews living here, and according to the 1897 census, there were 710. The Jewish district in Kleszczele was not educated due to the small percentage of Jews in the city. Jews lived mainly in the market square and along the streets directly bordering the market square. The main synagogue was located on the then Chodiewnicka (supposedly today's Przechodnia) Street, and in the interwar period, Kościelna Street. Jews also lived on Ciasna, Kościuszki, Kopernika and Łaziebna Streets. In the vicinity of the synagogue, there was one located in one of the auxiliary buildings at the synagogue.

In the Interwar period, Kleszczele did not have a rabbi. A rabbi from Orla came to the ceremonies. The Jewish cemetery was located about 1500 meters from the city on the road to Czeremcha. The first wooden synagogue existed at the beginning of the 19th century. In 1881, this building burned down along with part of the city. In this place, on September 30, 1881, on the initiative and largely with his own financial support, Mosze Gwin began building a new wooden synagogue. The building was located right next to the market square. During the German occupation, this synagogue was dismantled and a residential building was built from its materials on Boćkowska Street.

== Notable residents ==
- Peretz Hirschbein (1880–1948), playwright, novelist, journalist
