= Rzepiska =

Rzepiska may refer to:

- Rzepiska, Lesser Poland Voivodeship (south Poland)
- Rzepiska, Podlaskie Voivodeship (north-east Poland)
- Rzepiska, Pomeranian Voivodeship (north Poland)
