= Łutownia =

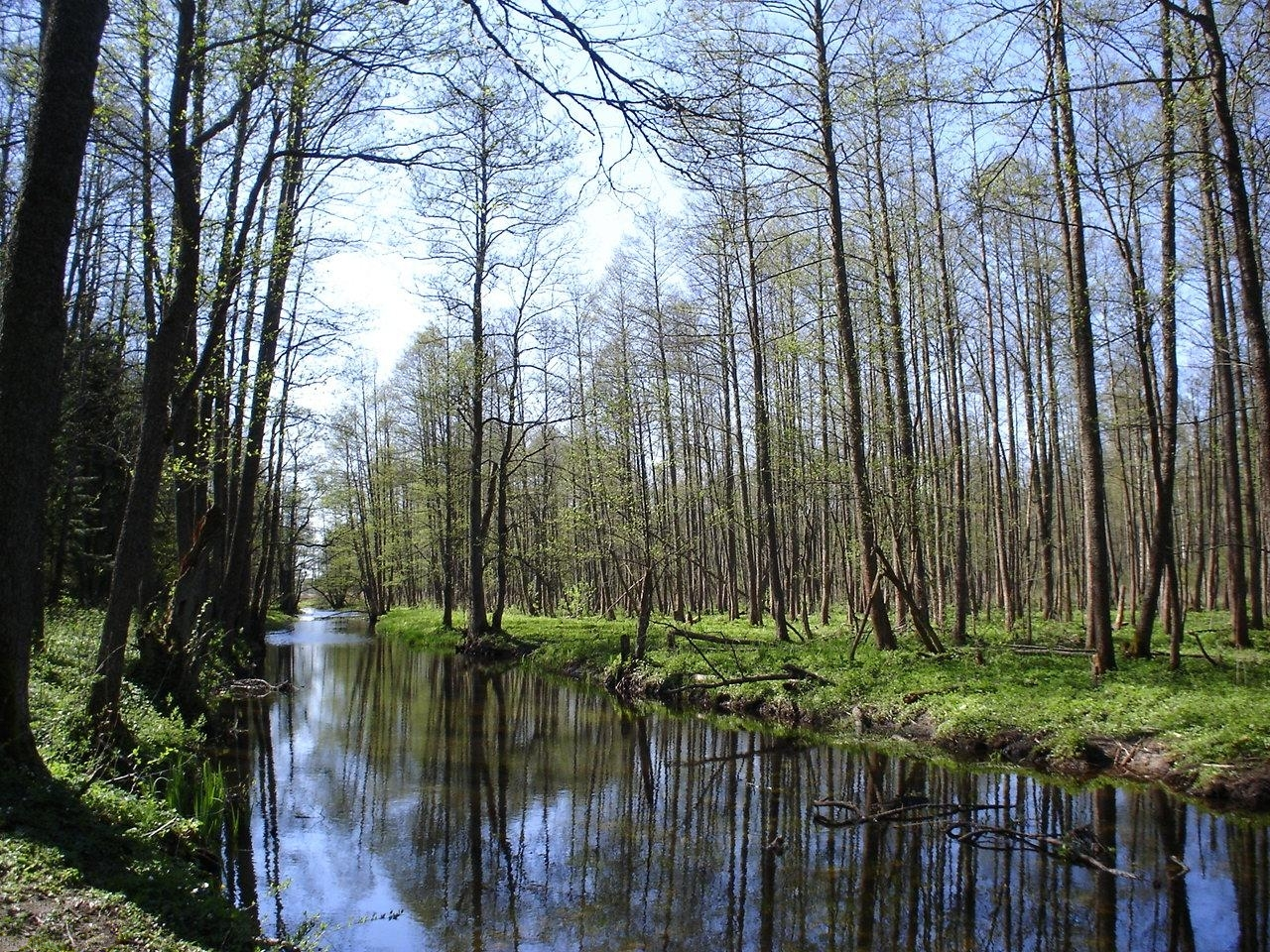
- Łutownia River at Dęby Królewskie (Royal Oaks)

Location
- Country: Poland

Physical characteristics
- Source
  - location: Nowosady
- Mouth
  - location: at Stara Białowieża on the Narewka
  - coordinates: 52°44′34″N 23°49′00″E
- Length: 19.19 km (11.92 mi)
- Basin size: 120.44 km^{2} (46.50 sq mi)

Basin features
- Progression: Narewka→ Narew→ Vistula→ Baltic Sea

Łutownia River on map of Białowieża Forest

The Łutownia (Polish pronunciation: [wuˈtɔvɲa]; Belarusian: Лутоўня), in northeast Poland, is a left-bank tributary of the Narewka River. It was formerly known in Polish as the Łętownia [wɛnˈtɔvɲa], Lętownia [lɛnˈtɔvɲa], Łotownia [wɔˈtɔvɲa], Łutownica [wutɔvˈnit͡sa], Latownica [latɔvˈnit͡sa], Lutownia [luˈtɔvɲa], and Szczekotówka [ʂt͡ʂɛkɔˈtufka] River.

The Łutownia flows through the European region known as the Wysoczyzny Podlasko – Bialoruskie (Podlasie-Belarus Plateau) in Poland's Podlasie Province and Belarus' Hrodna Voblast. The river, from its origin to its mouth, flows through the Białowieża Forest.

Villages:

- Nowosady/Zwodzieckie
- Teremiski

Main tributaries (right bank):

- Dubinka
- Krynica
