= Basen, Podlaskie Voivodeship =

Basen
- Settlement
- Location within Poland
- Coordinates: 52°38′17″N 23°37′37″E
- Country: Poland
- Voivodeship: Podlaskie
- County: Hajnówka
- Gmina: Gmina Hajnówka

Basen [ˈbasɛn] is a settlement in the administrative district of Gmina Hajnówka, within Hajnówka County, Podlaskie Voivodeship, in north-eastern Poland, close to the border with Belarus. It lies approximately 12 kilometres (7 mi) south of Hajnówka and 62 km (39 mi) south-east of the regional capital Białystok.
