= Postołowo, Podlaskie Voivodeship =

Postołowo
- Village
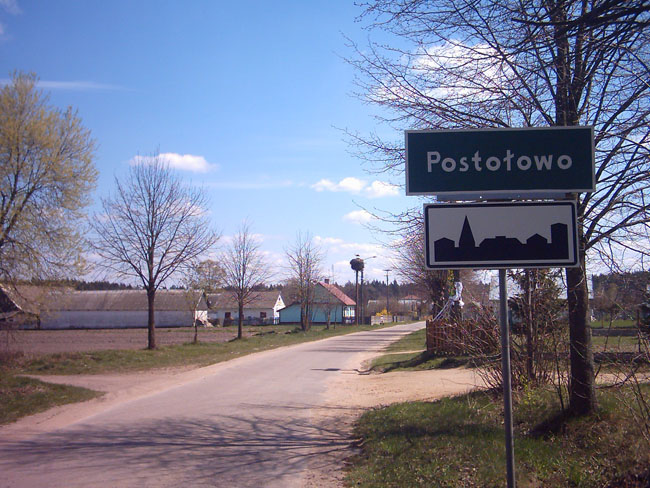
- Road sign in Postołowo

- Location within Poland
- Coordinates: 52°42′18″N 23°31′58″E
- Country: Poland
- Voivodeship: Podlaskie
- County: Hajnówka
- Gmina: Hajnówka

Postołowo [pɔstɔˈwɔvɔ] is a village in the administrative district of Gmina Hajnówka, within Hajnówka County, Podlaskie Voivodeship, in north-eastern Poland, close to the border with Belarus.
