= Sosnówka, Podlaskie Voivodeship =

Sosnówka
- Village
- Location within Poland
- Coordinates: 52°40′39″N 23°33′47″E
- Country: Poland
- Voivodeship: Podlaskie
- County: Hajnówka
- Gmina: Hajnówka

Sosnówka [sɔsˈnufka] is a village in the administrative district of Gmina Hajnówka, within Hajnówka County, Podlaskie Voivodeship, in north-eastern Poland, close to the border with Belarus.
