= Majdan, Hajnówka County =

Majdan
- Settlement
- Location within Poland
- Coordinates: 52°37′47″N 23°37′39″E
- Country: Poland
- Voivodeship: Podlaskie
- County: Hajnówka
- Gmina: Hajnówka

Majdan (Polish pronunciation: [ˈmajdan]) is a settlement in the administrative district of Gmina Hajnówka, within Hajnówka County, Podlaskie Voivodeship, in north-eastern Poland, close to the border with Belarus.
