= Olchowa Kładka =

- Village
- Location within Poland
- Coordinates: 52°49′50″N 23°36′3″E
- Country: Poland
- Voivodeship: Podlaskie
- County: Hajnówka
- Gmina: Hajnówka

Olchowa Kładka [ɔlˈxɔva ˈkwatka] is a village in the administrative district of Gmina Hajnówka, within Hajnówka County, Podlaskie Voivodeship, in north-eastern Poland, close to the border with Belarus.
