= Przechody, Hajnówka County =

Przechody
- Village
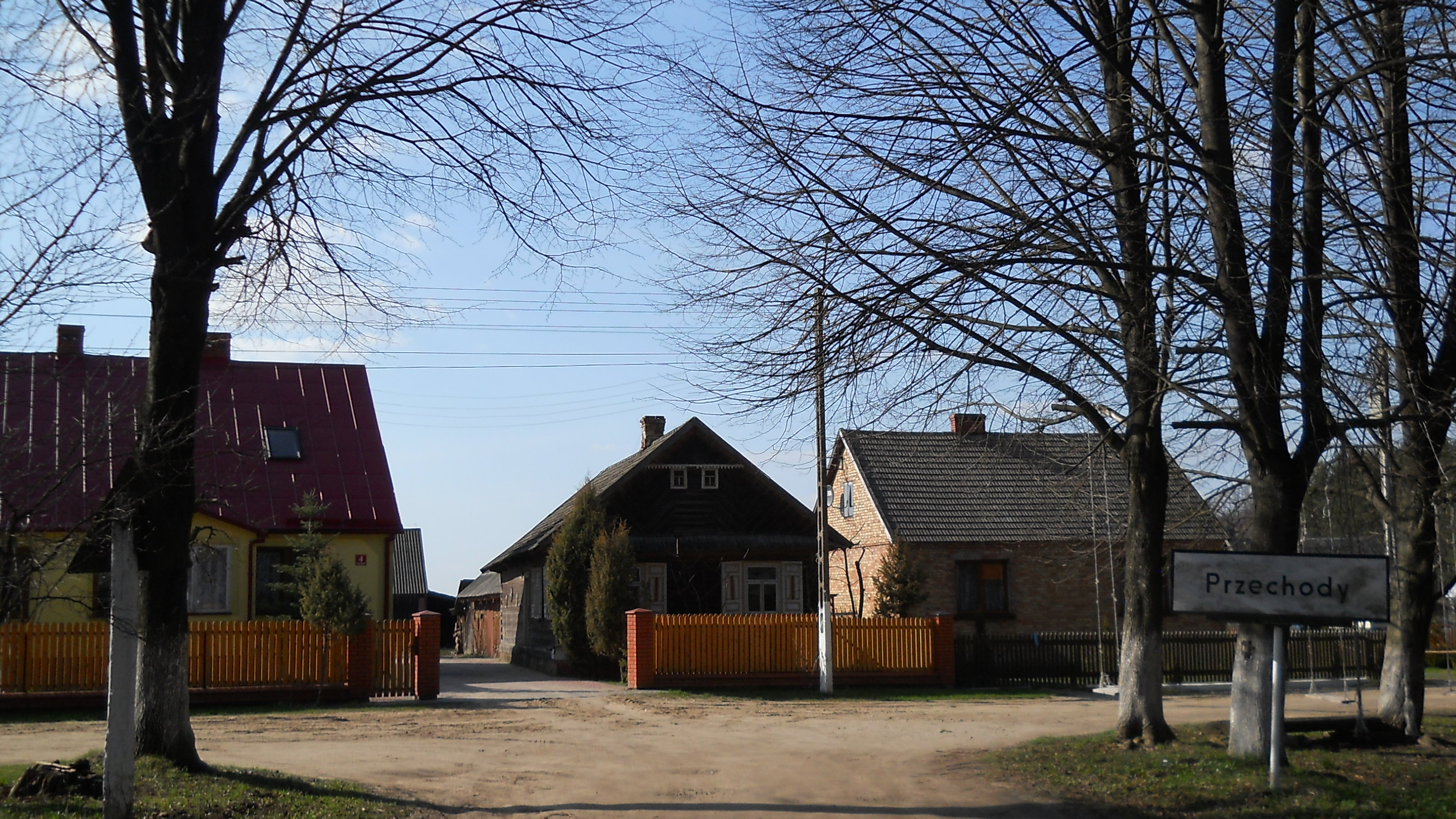

- Location within Poland
- Coordinates: 52°48′37″N 23°37′13″E
- Country: Poland
- Voivodeship: Podlaskie
- County: Hajnówka
- Gmina: Hajnówka

Przechody [pʂɛˈxɔdɨ] is a village in the administrative district of Gmina Hajnówka, within Hajnówka County, Podlaskie Voivodeship, in north-eastern Poland, close to the border with Belarus.
