= Gmina Hajnówka =

Gmina Hajnówka Hajnówka Commune
- Gmina
- Coat of arms
- Interactive map of Gmina Hajnówka
- Coordinates (Hajnówka): 52°44′N 23°34′E
- Country: Poland
- Voivodeship: Podlaskie
- County: Hajnówka
- Seat: Hajnówka

Area
  - Total: 293.15 km^{2} (113.19 sq mi)

Population (2006)
  - Total: 4,273
  - Density: 14.58/km^{2} (37.75/sq mi)
- Website: http://www.gmina-hajnowka.pl/

Gmina Hajnówka (Belarusian: Гміна Гайнаўка) is a rural gmina (administrative district) in Hajnówka County, Podlaskie Voivodeship, in north-eastern Poland, on the border with Belarus. Its seat is the town of Hajnówka, although the town is not part of the territory of the gmina.

The gmina covers an area of 293.15 square kilometres (113.2 sq mi), and as of 2006 its total population is 4,273.

It is one of five Polish/Belarusian bilingual Gmina in Podlaskie Voivodeship regulated by the Act of 6 January 2005 on National and Ethnic Minorities and on the Regional Languages, which permits certain gminas with significant linguistic minorities to introduce a second, auxiliary language to be used in official contexts alongside Polish.

== Villages ==
Gmina Hajnówka contains the villages and settlements of Basen, Bielszczyzna, Bokówka, Borek, Borysówka, Chytra, Czyżyki, Dubicze Osoczne, Dubińska Ferma, Dubiny, Golakowa Szyja, Kotówka, Lipiny, Łozice, Majdan, Mochnate, Nowoberezowo, Nowokornino, Nowosady, Olchowa Kładka, Olszyna, Orzeszkowo, Pasieczniki Duże, Pasieczniki Wielkie, Pasieczniki-Stebki, Postołowo, Progale, Przechody, Puciska, Rzepiska, Sacharewo, Skryplewo, Smolany Sadek, Sorocza Nóżka, Sosnówka, Sowiny Grunt, Stare Berezowo, Topiło, Trywieża, Wasilkowo, Wygoda, Wygon and Zwodzieckie.

== Neighbouring gminas ==
Gmina Hajnówka is bordered by the town of Hajnówka and by the gminas of Białowieża, Czyże, Dubicze Cerkiewne, Narew and Narewka. It also borders Belarus.
