= Progale =

- Village
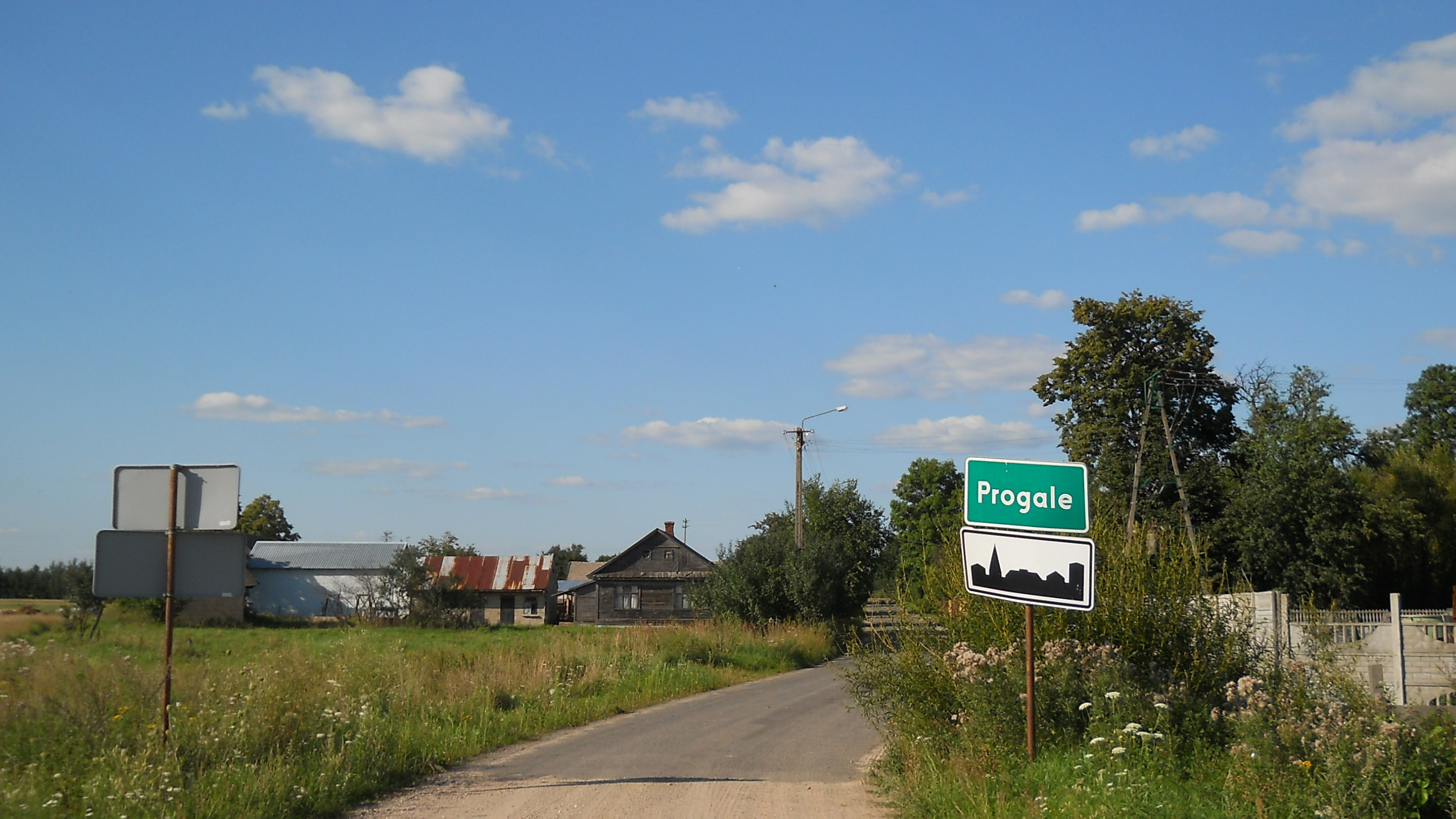
- Road sign in Progale

- Location within Poland
- Coordinates: 52°44′00″N 23°32′40″E
- Country: Poland
- Voivodeship: Podlaskie
- County: Hajnówka
- Gmina: Hajnówka

Progale [prɔˈɡalɛ] is a village in the administrative district of Gmina Hajnówka, within Hajnówka County, Podlaskie Voivodeship, in north-eastern Poland, close to the border with Belarus.
