= Borek, Hajnówka County =

Borek
- Village
- Location within Poland
- Coordinates: 52°43′N 23°31′E
- Country: Poland
- Voivodeship: Podlaskie
- County: Hajnówka
- Gmina: Hajnówka

Borek [ˈbɔrɛk] is a village in the administrative district of Gmina Hajnówka, within Hajnówka County, Podlaskie Voivodeship, in north-eastern Poland, close to the border with Belarus.
