= Sowiny Grunt =

- Village
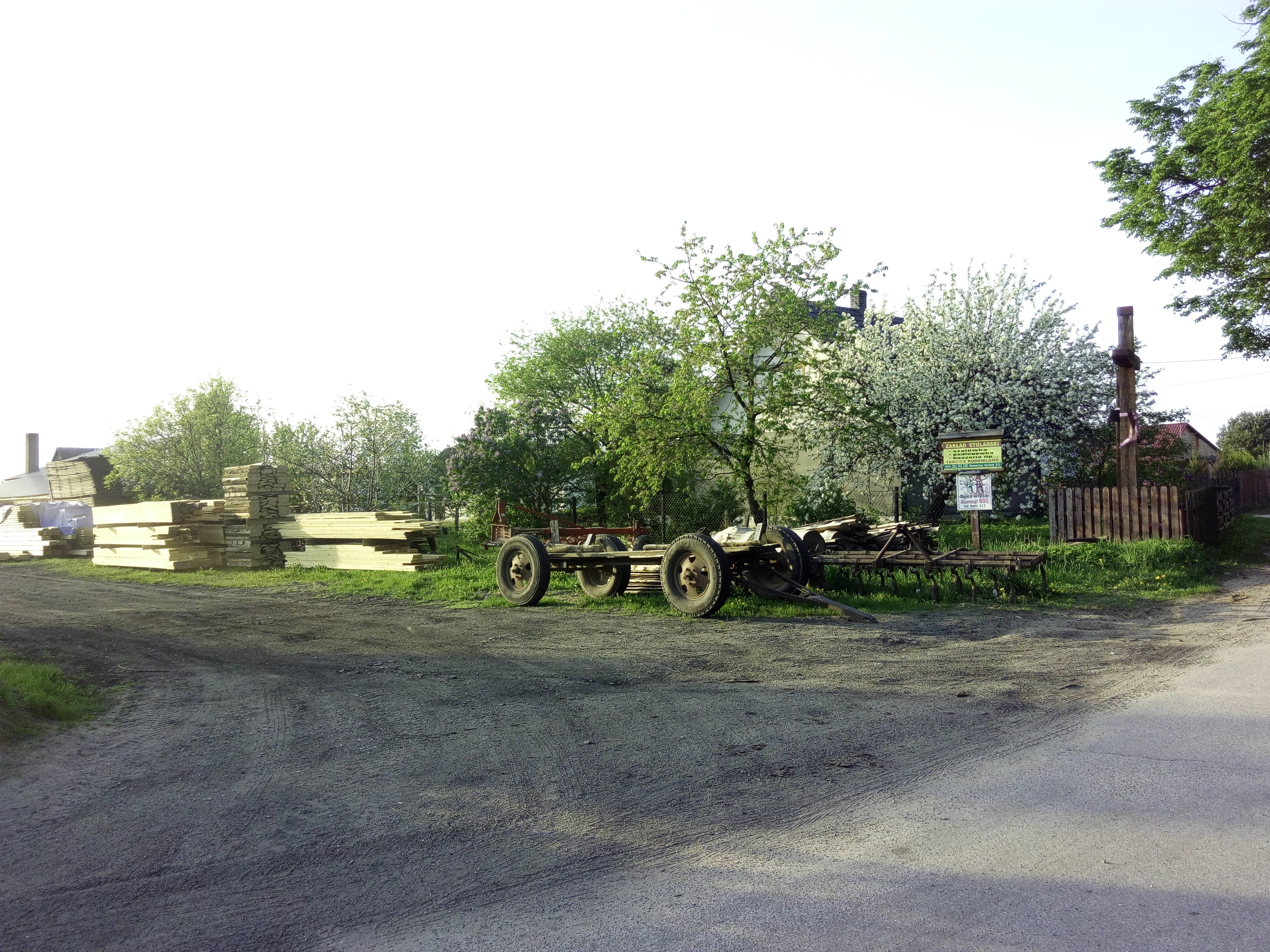

- Location within Poland
- Coordinates: 52°45′50″N 23°36′3″E
- Country: Poland
- Voivodeship: Podlaskie
- County: Hajnówka
- Gmina: Hajnówka

Sowiny Grunt [sɔˈvinɨ ˈɡrunt] is a village in the administrative district of Gmina Hajnówka, within Hajnówka County, Podlaskie Voivodeship, in north-eastern Poland, close to the border with Belarus.
