= Trywieża =

- Village
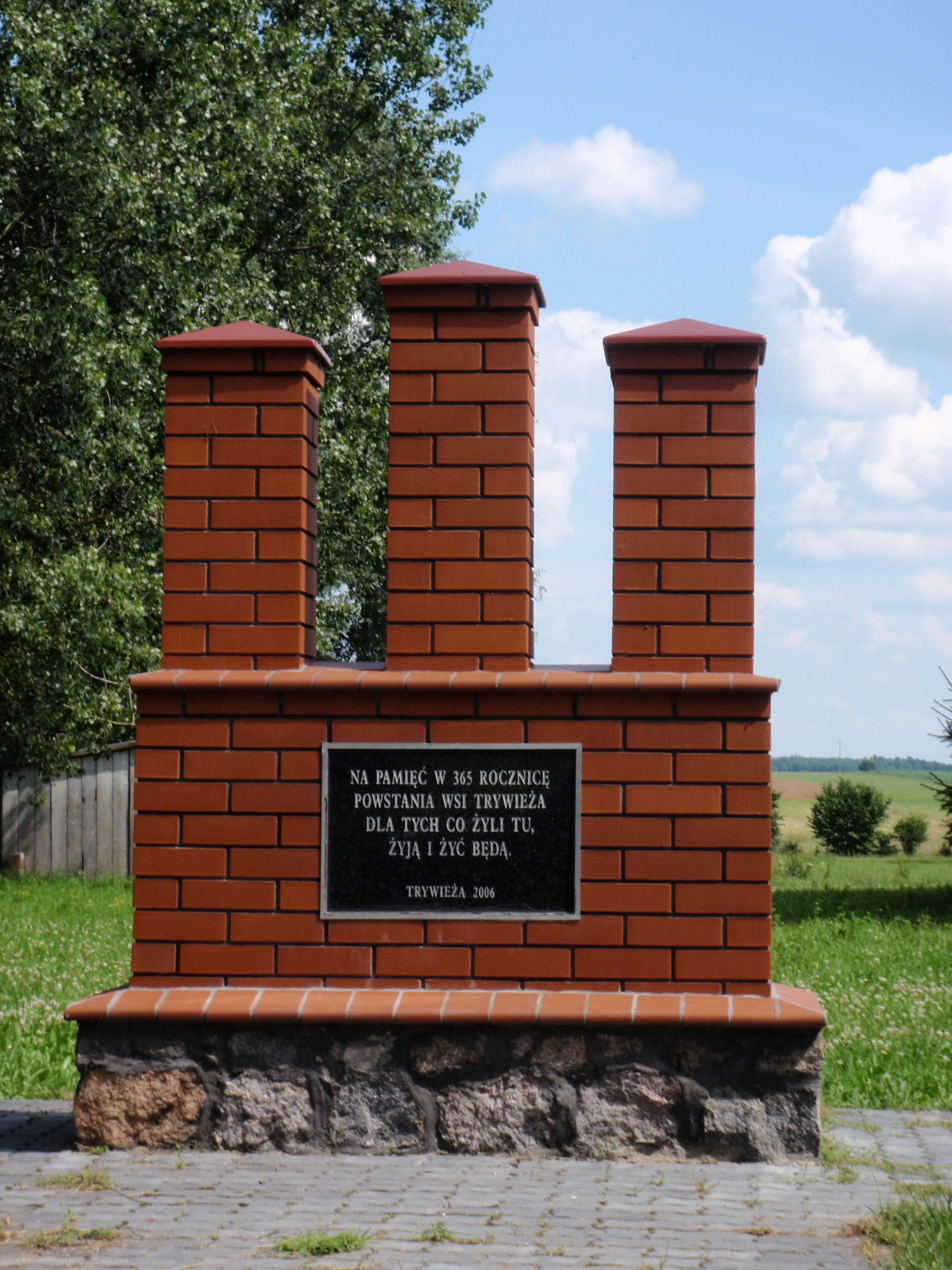
- Monument commemorating 365th anniversary of the establishment of the village

- Location within Poland
- Coordinates: 52°49′N 23°32′E
- Country: Poland
- Voivodeship: Podlaskie
- County: Hajnówka
- Gmina: Hajnówka

Trywieża [trɨˈvjɛʐa] (Belarusian: Tpі Вежя) is a village in the administrative district of Gmina Hajnówka, within Hajnówka County, Podlaskie Voivodeship, in north-eastern Poland, close to the border with Belarus.
