= Kotówka, Podlaskie Voivodeship =

Kotówka
- Village
- Location within Poland
- Coordinates: 52°49′N 23°34′E
- Country: Poland
- Voivodeship: Podlaskie
- County: Hajnówka
- Gmina: Hajnówka
- Population: 75

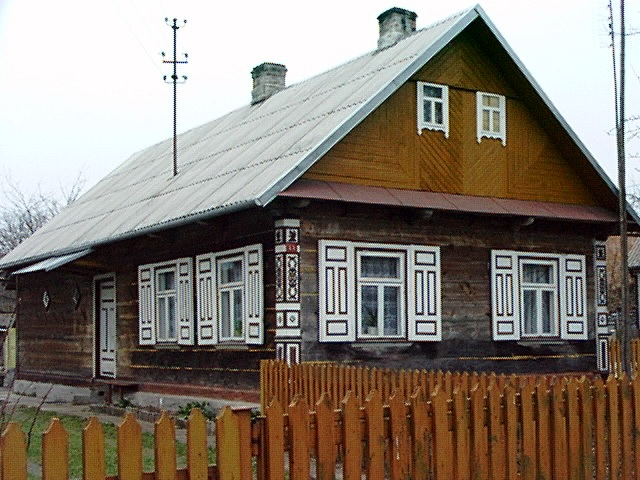
Wooden house in Kotówka

Kotówka [kɔˈtufka] is a village in the administrative district of Gmina Hajnówka, within Hajnówka County, Podlaskie Voivodeship, in north-eastern Poland, close to the border with Belarus. Kotówka is famous for wooden huts with traditional decoration on them for example huts from address Kotówka 9 and 13.
