= Sacharewo =

- Settlement
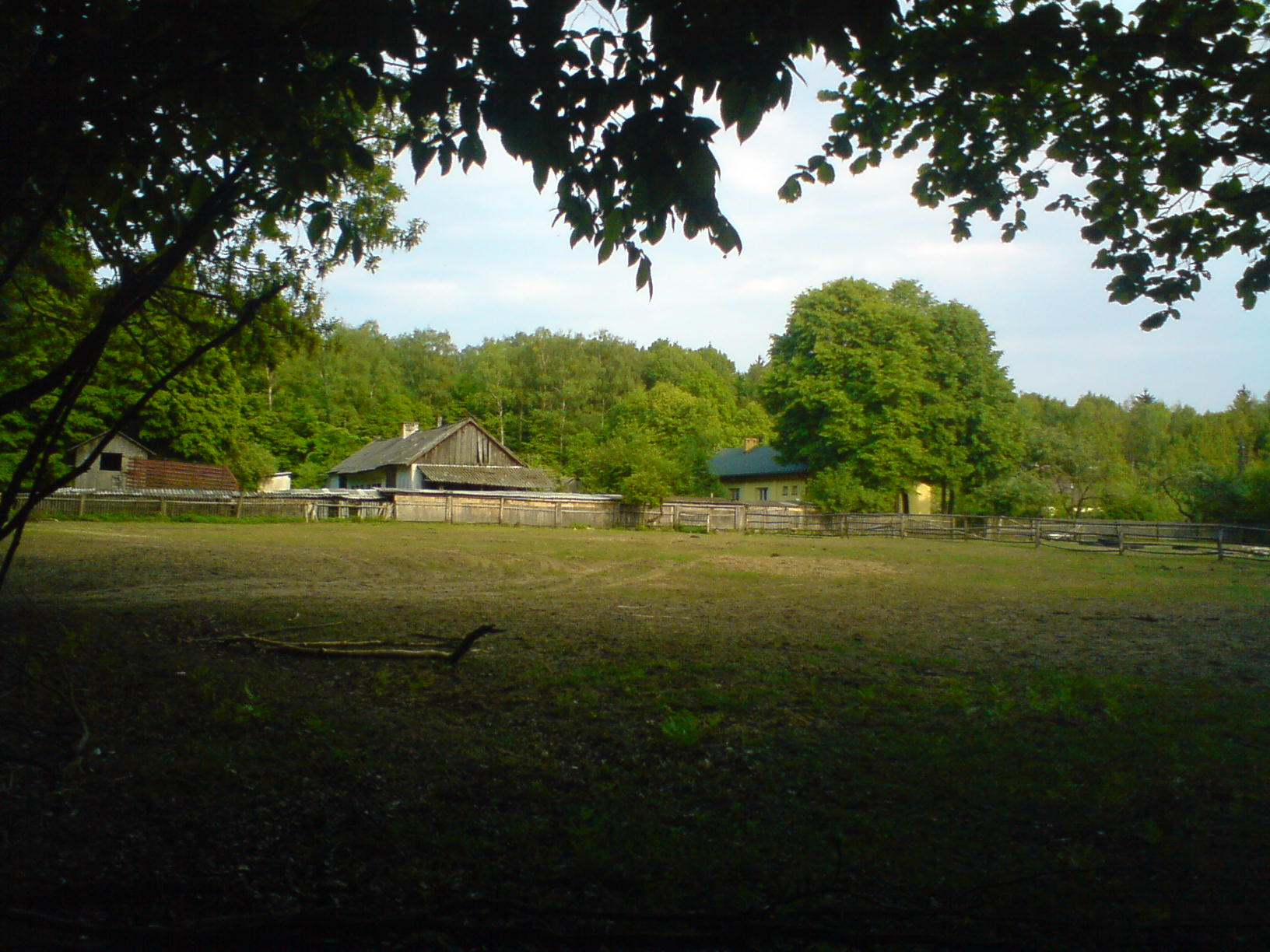
- Farm in Sacharewo

- Location within Poland
- Coordinates: 52°42′45″N 23°36′19″E
- Country: Poland
- Voivodeship: Podlaskie
- County: Hajnówka
- Gmina: Hajnówka

Sacharewo [saxaˈrɛvɔ] is a settlement in the administrative district of Gmina Hajnówka, within Hajnówka County, Podlaskie Voivodeship, in north-eastern Poland, close to the border with Belarus.
