= Puciska =

- Village
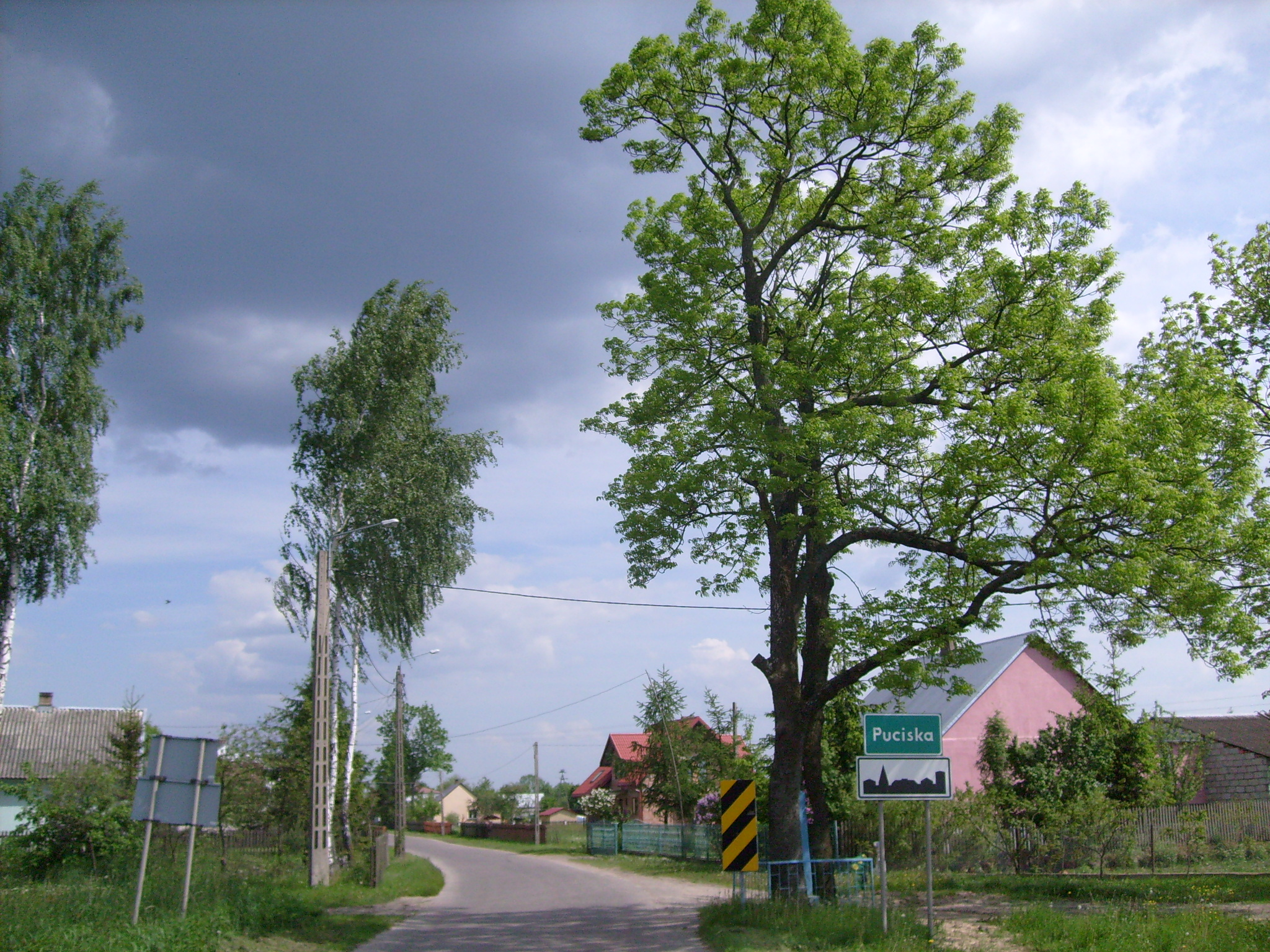
- Road sign to Puciska

- Location within Poland
- Coordinates: 52°45′50″N 23°32′57″E
- Country: Poland
- Voivodeship: Podlaskie
- County: Hajnówka
- Gmina: Hajnówka

Puciska [puˈt͡ɕiska] is a village in the administrative district of Gmina Hajnówka, within Hajnówka County, Podlaskie Voivodeship, in north-eastern Poland, close to the border with Belarus.
