= Olszyna, Podlaskie Voivodeship =

Olszyna
- Village
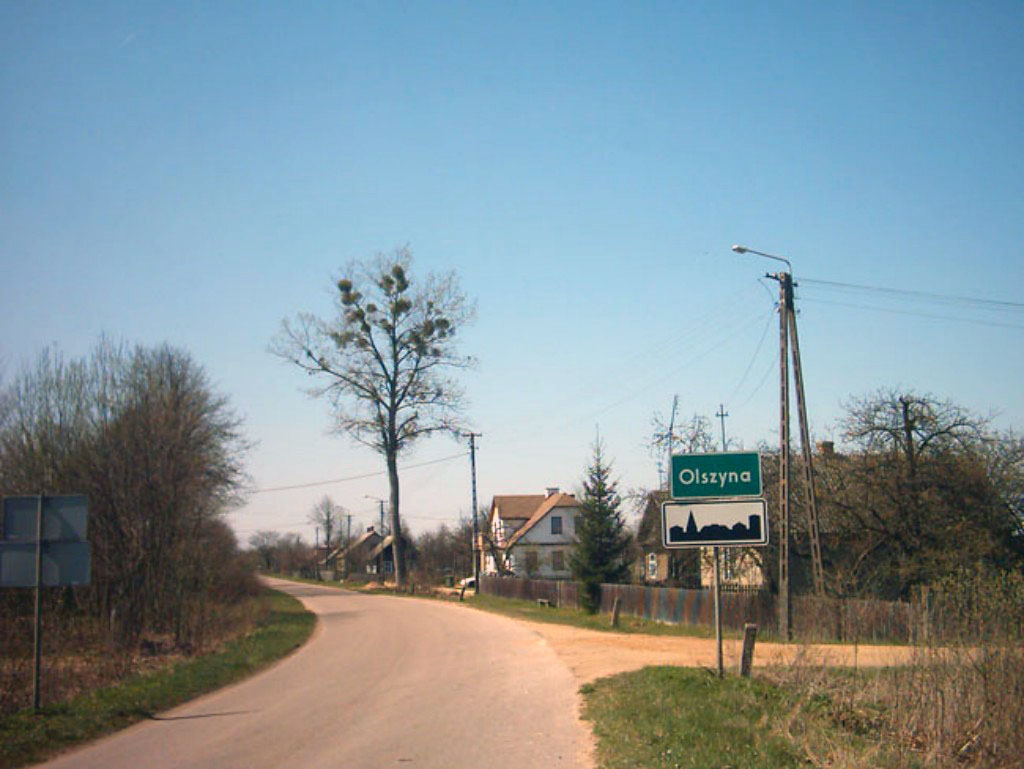

- Location within Poland
- Coordinates: 52°40′31″N 23°33′11″E
- Country: Poland
- Voivodeship: Podlaskie
- County: Hajnówka
- Gmina: Hajnówka

Olszyna [ɔlˈʂɨna] is a village in the administrative district of Gmina Hajnówka, within Hajnówka County, Podlaskie Voivodeship, in north-eastern Poland, close to the border with Belarus.
