= Czyżyki =

- Village
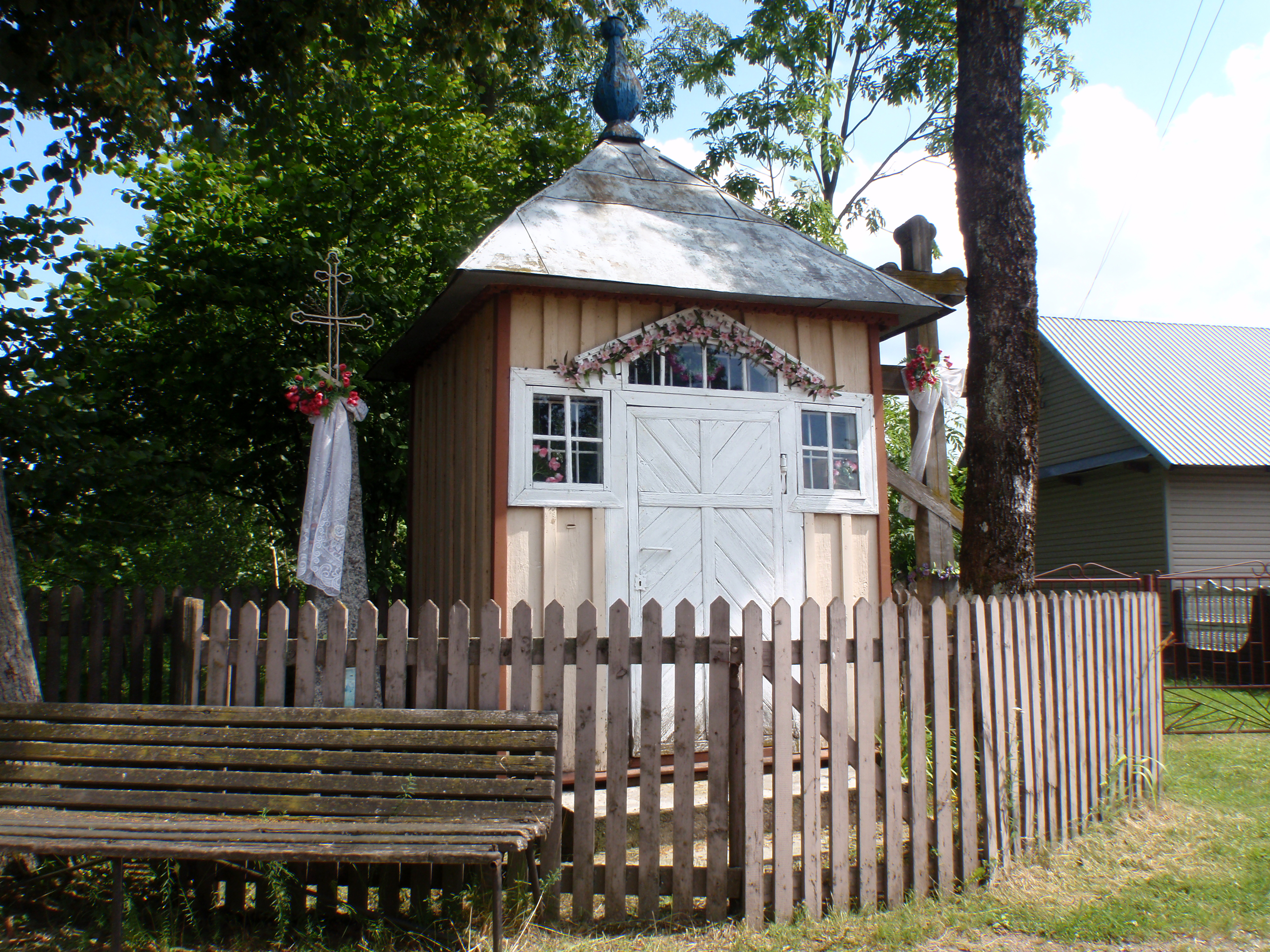
- Eastern Orthodox chapel

- Location within Poland
- Coordinates: 52°47′N 23°32′E
- Country: Poland
- Voivodeship: Podlaskie
- County: Hajnówka
- Gmina: Hajnówka

Czyżyki [t͡ʂɨˈʐɨki] is a village in the administrative district of Gmina Hajnówka, within Hajnówka County, Podlaskie Voivodeship, in north-eastern Poland, close to the border with Belarus.

According to the 1921 census, the village was inhabited by 299 people, among whom 1 were Roman Catholic, 277 Orthodox, 11 Evangelical and 10 Mosaic. At the same time, 278 inhabitants declared Belarusian nationality, 11 German and 10 Jewish. There were 74 residential buildings in the village.
