= Wygon, Gmina Hajnówka =

Wygon
- Village
- Location within Poland
- Coordinates: 52°40′9″N 23°32′53″E
- Country: Poland
- Voivodeship: Podlaskie
- County: Hajnówka
- Gmina: Hajnówka

Wygon [ˈvɨɡɔn] is a village in the administrative district of Gmina Hajnówka, within Hajnówka County, Podlaskie Voivodeship, in north-eastern Poland, close to the border with Belarus.
