= Mochnate =

- Village
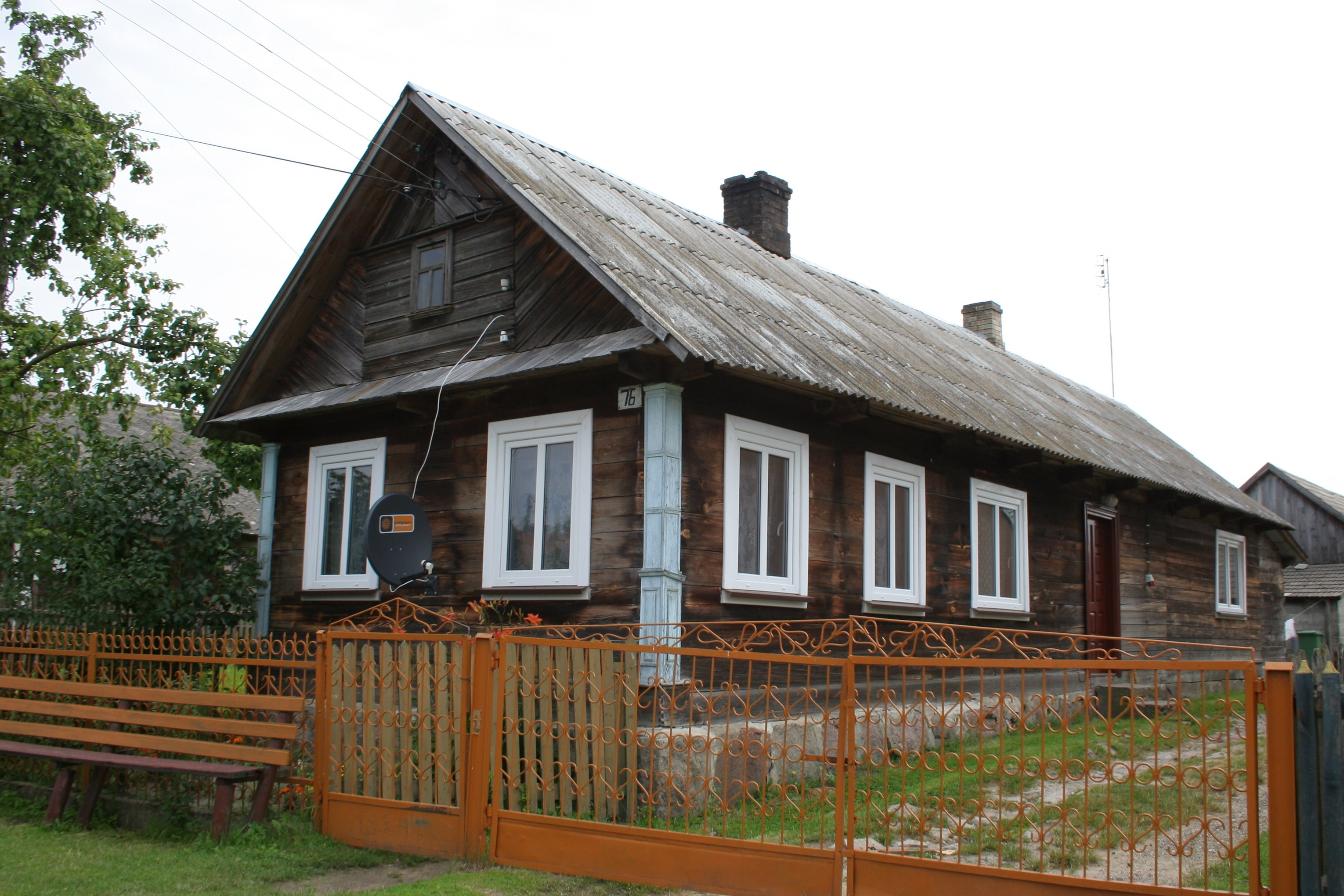

- Location within Poland
- Coordinates: 52°43′N 23°27′E
- Country: Poland
- Voivodeship: Podlaskie
- County: Hajnówka
- Gmina: Hajnówka

Population
  - Total: 350
- Time zone: UTC+1 (CET)
  - Summer (DST): UTC+2 (CEST)
- Vehicle registration: BHA

Mochnate [mɔxˈnatɛ] is a village in the administrative district of Gmina Hajnówka, within Hajnówka County, Podlaskie Voivodeship, in eastern Poland, close to the border with Belarus.
