= Orzeszkowo, Podlaskie Voivodeship =

Orzeszkowo
- Village
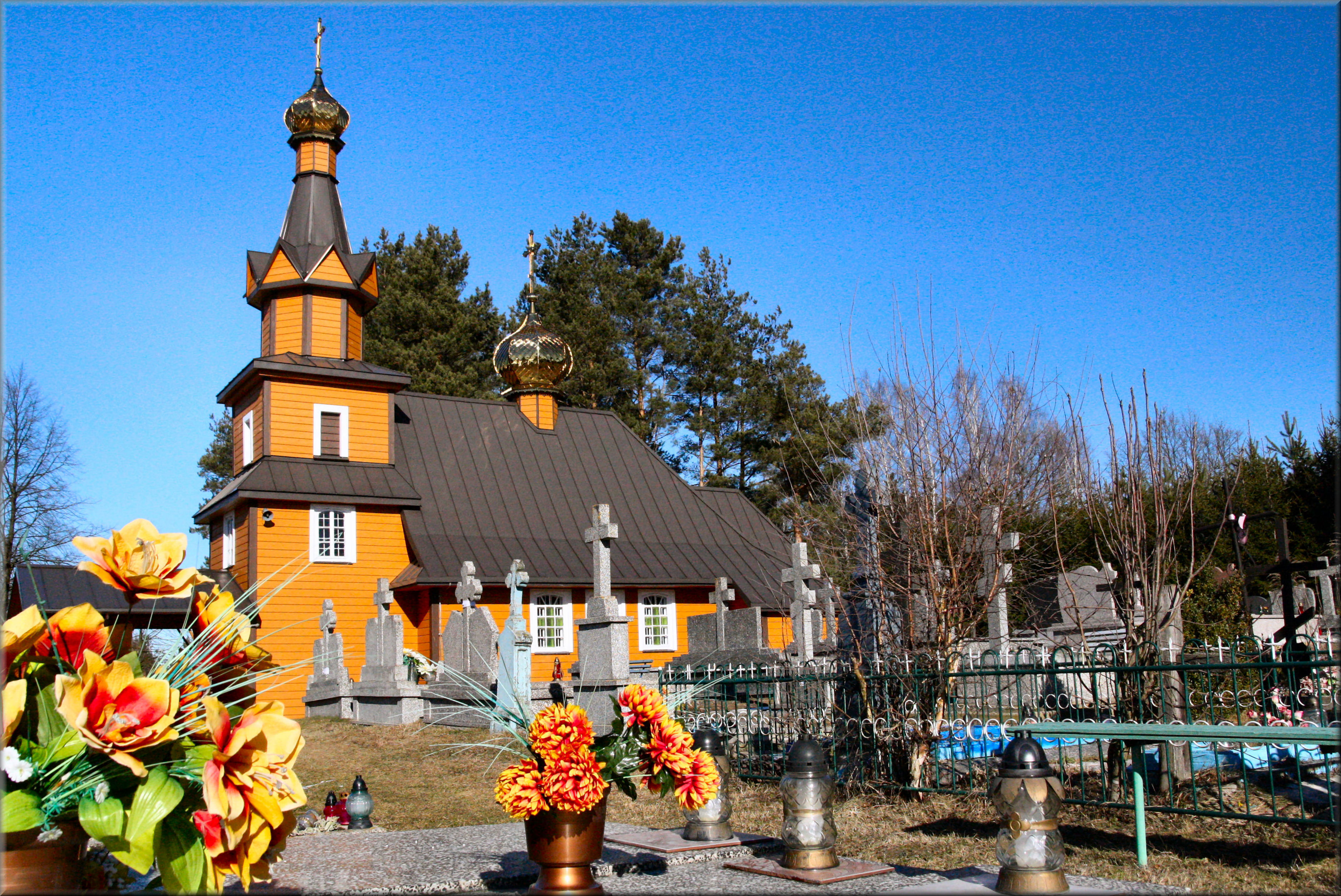
- Church of the Ascension in Orzeszkowo

- Location within Poland
- Coordinates: 52°41′N 23°33′E
- Country: Poland
- Voivodeship: Podlaskie
- County: Hajnówka
- Gmina: Hajnówka

Orzeszkowo [ɔʐɛʂˈkɔvɔ] (Belarusian: Арэшкава, Podlachian: Orêškovo) is a village in the administrative district of Gmina Hajnówka, within Hajnówka County, Podlaskie Voivodeship, in north-eastern Poland, close to the border with Belarus.
