= Borysówka =

- Village
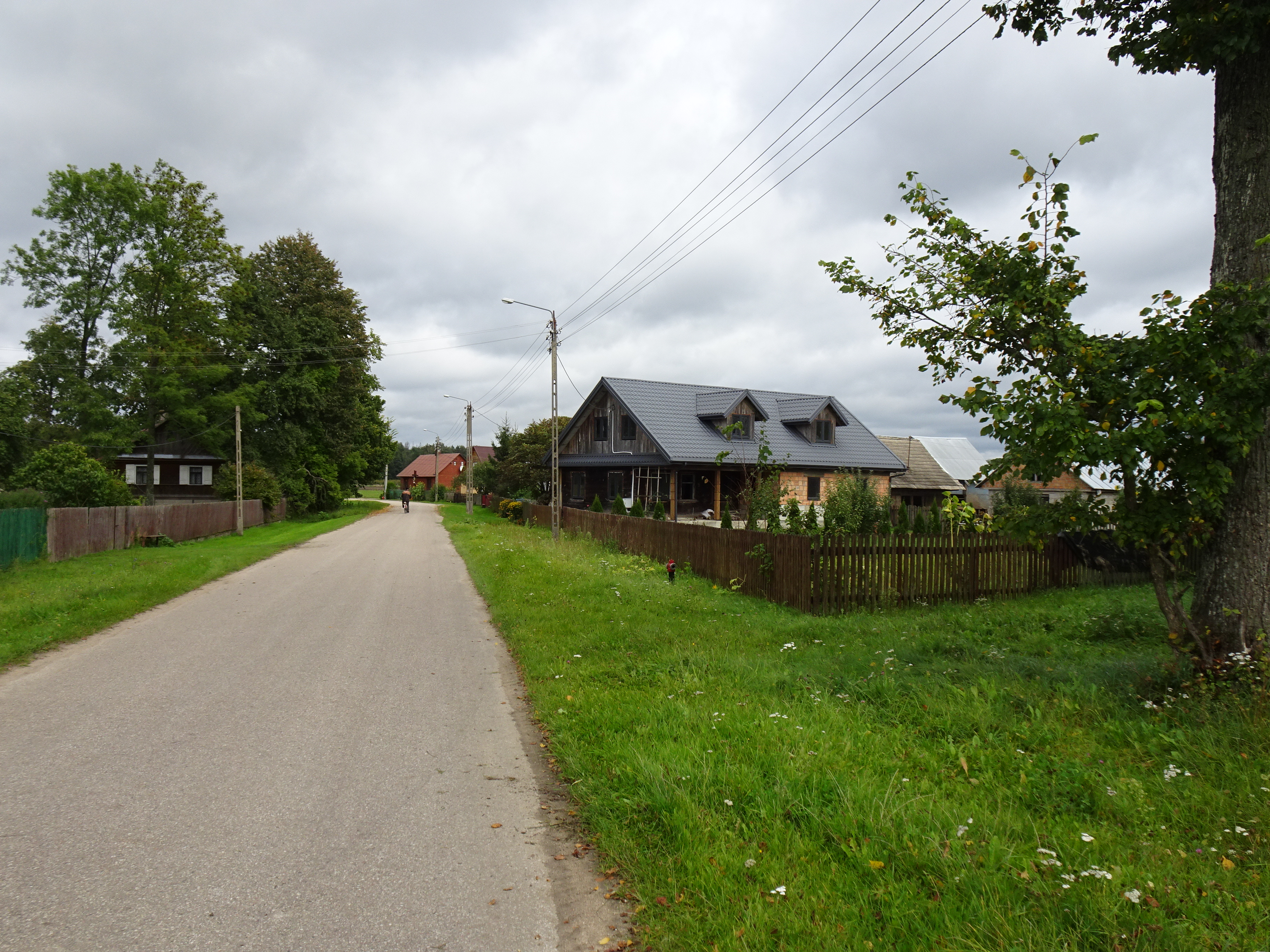

- Location within Poland
- Coordinates: 52°50′N 23°37′E
- Country: Poland
- Voivodeship: Podlaskie
- County: Hajnówka
- Gmina: Hajnówka

Borysówka (Polish: [bɔrɨˈsufka]) is a village in the administrative district of Gmina Hajnówka, within Hajnówka County, Podlaskie Voivodeship, in north-eastern Poland, close to the border with Belarus.
