= Pasieczniki-Stebki =

- Village
- Location within Poland
- Coordinates: 52°42′50″N 23°34′15″E
- Country: Poland
- Voivodeship: Podlaskie
- County: Hajnówka
- Gmina: Hajnówka

Pasieczniki-Stebki [paɕɛt͡ʂˈniki ˈstɛpki] is a village in the administrative district of Gmina Hajnówka, within Hajnówka County, Podlaskie Voivodeship, in north-eastern Poland, close to the border with Belarus.
