= Stare Berezowo =

- Village
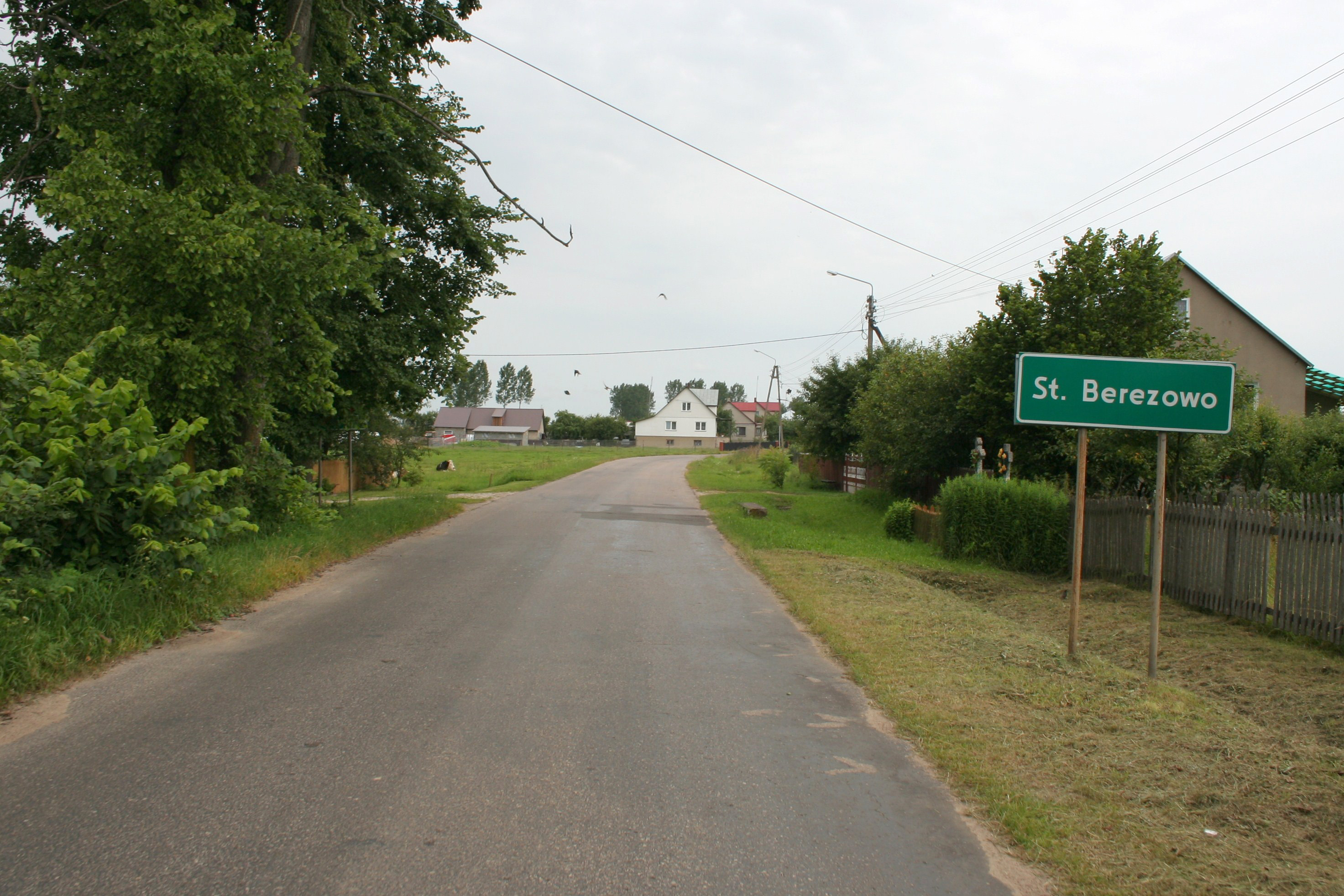

- Location within Poland
- Coordinates: 52°44′17″N 23°27′25″E
- Country: Poland
- Voivodeship: Podlaskie
- County: Hajnówka
- Gmina: Hajnówka
- Population: 430

Stare Berezowo [ˈstarɛ bɛrɛˈzɔvɔ] is a village in the administrative district of Gmina Hajnówka, within Hajnówka County, Podlaskie Voivodeship, in north-eastern Poland, close to the border with Belarus.
