= Pasieczniki Duże =

- Village
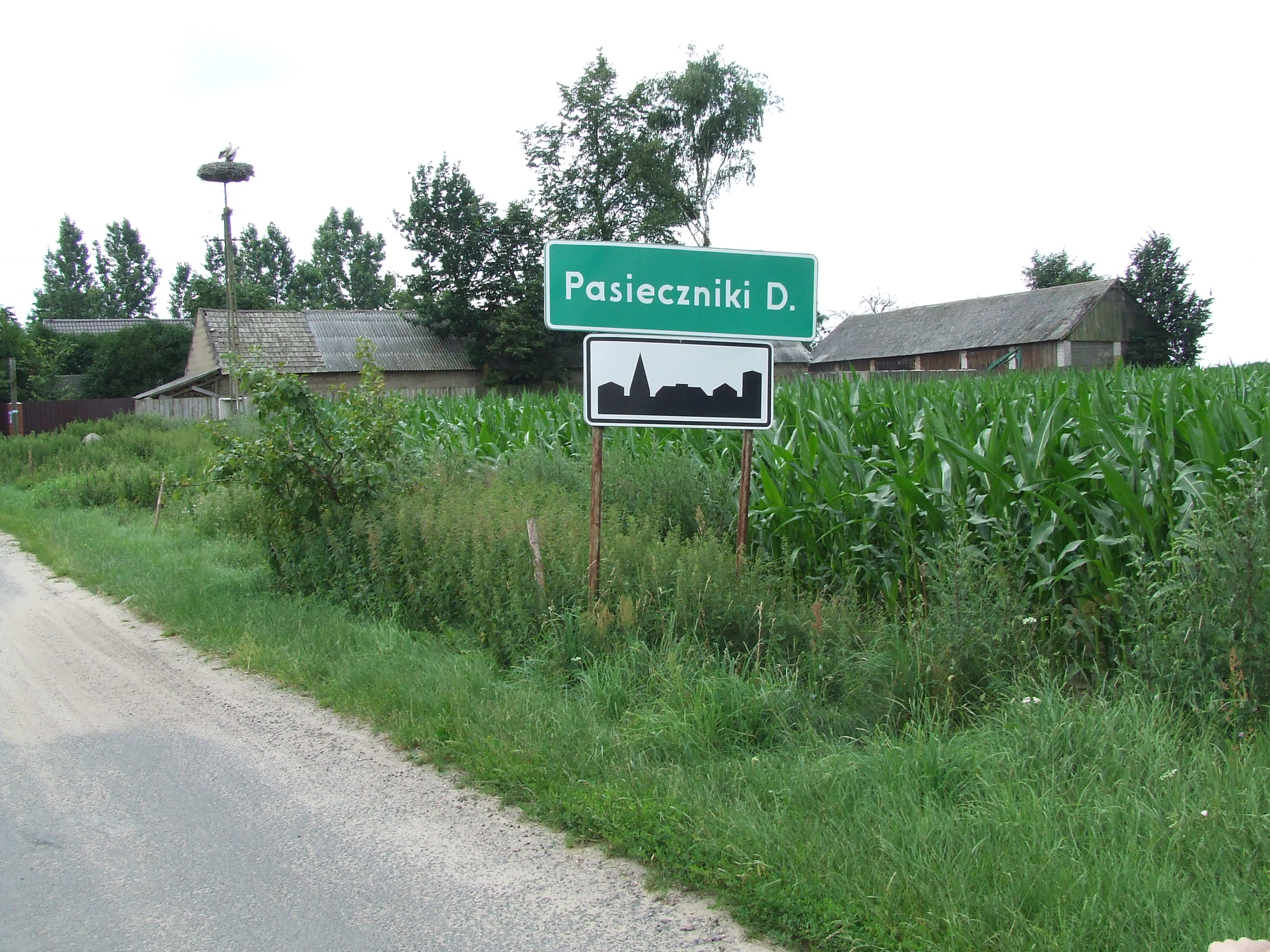

- Location within Poland
- Coordinates: 52°42′N 23°34′E
- Country: Poland
- Voivodeship: Podlaskie
- County: Hajnówka
- Gmina: Hajnówka

Pasieczniki Duże [paɕɛt͡ʂˈniki ˈduʐɛ] (Belarusian: Вялікія Пасечнікі, Podlachian: Velíki Paséčniki) is a village in the administrative district of Gmina Hajnówka, within Hajnówka County, Podlaskie Voivodeship, in north-eastern Poland, close to the border with Belarus.
