= Wygoda, Hajnówka County =

Wygoda
- Village
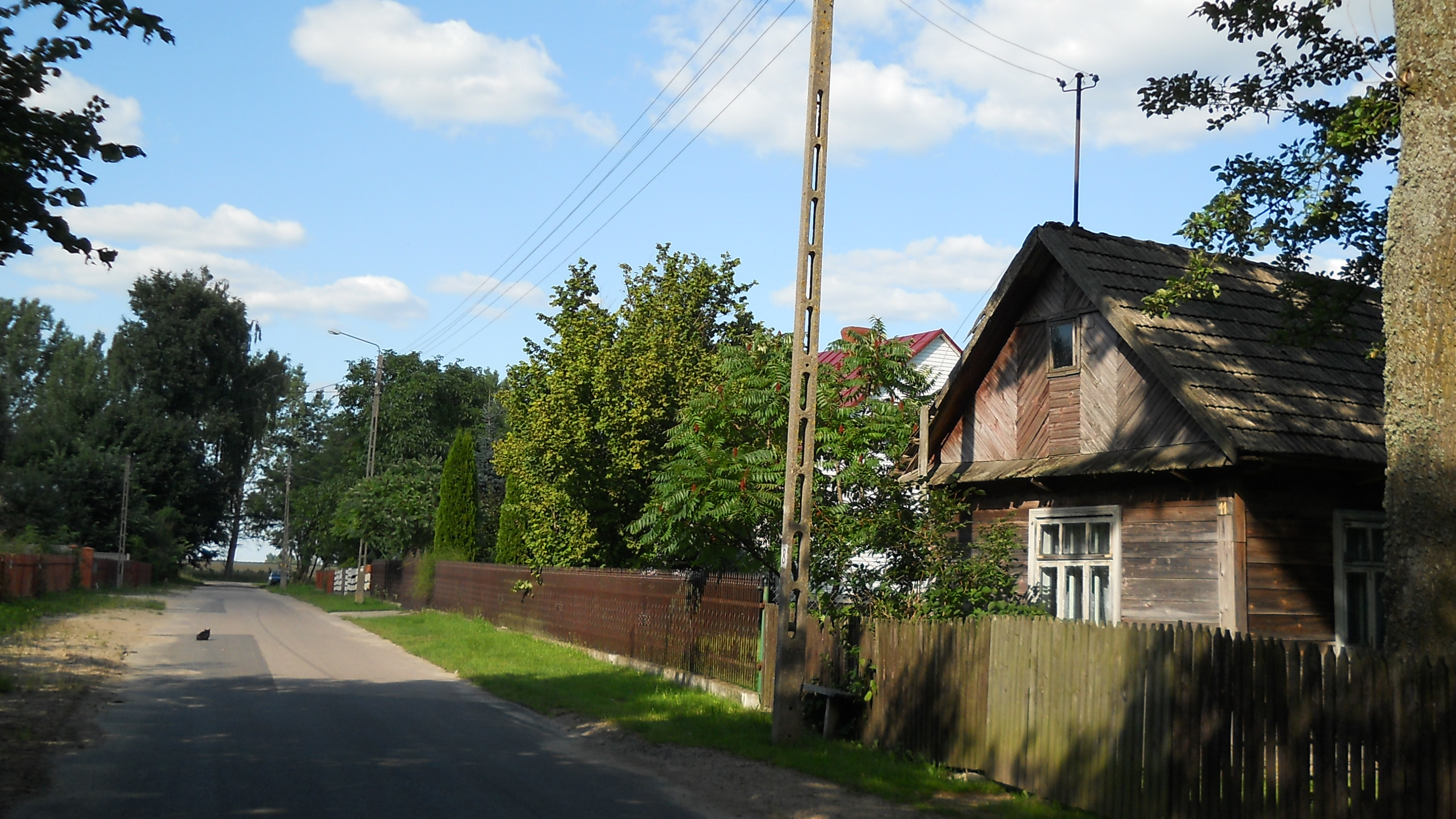

- Location within Poland
- Coordinates: 52°45′10″N 23°32′34″E
- Country: Poland
- Voivodeship: Podlaskie
- County: Hajnówka
- Gmina: Hajnówka
- Time zone: UTC+1 (CET)
  - Summer (DST): UTC+2 (CEST)
- Vehicle registration: BHA

Wygoda [vɨˈɡɔda] is a village in the administrative district of Gmina Hajnówka, within Hajnówka County, Podlaskie Voivodeship, in eastern Poland, close to the border with Belarus.
