= Nowokornino =

- Village
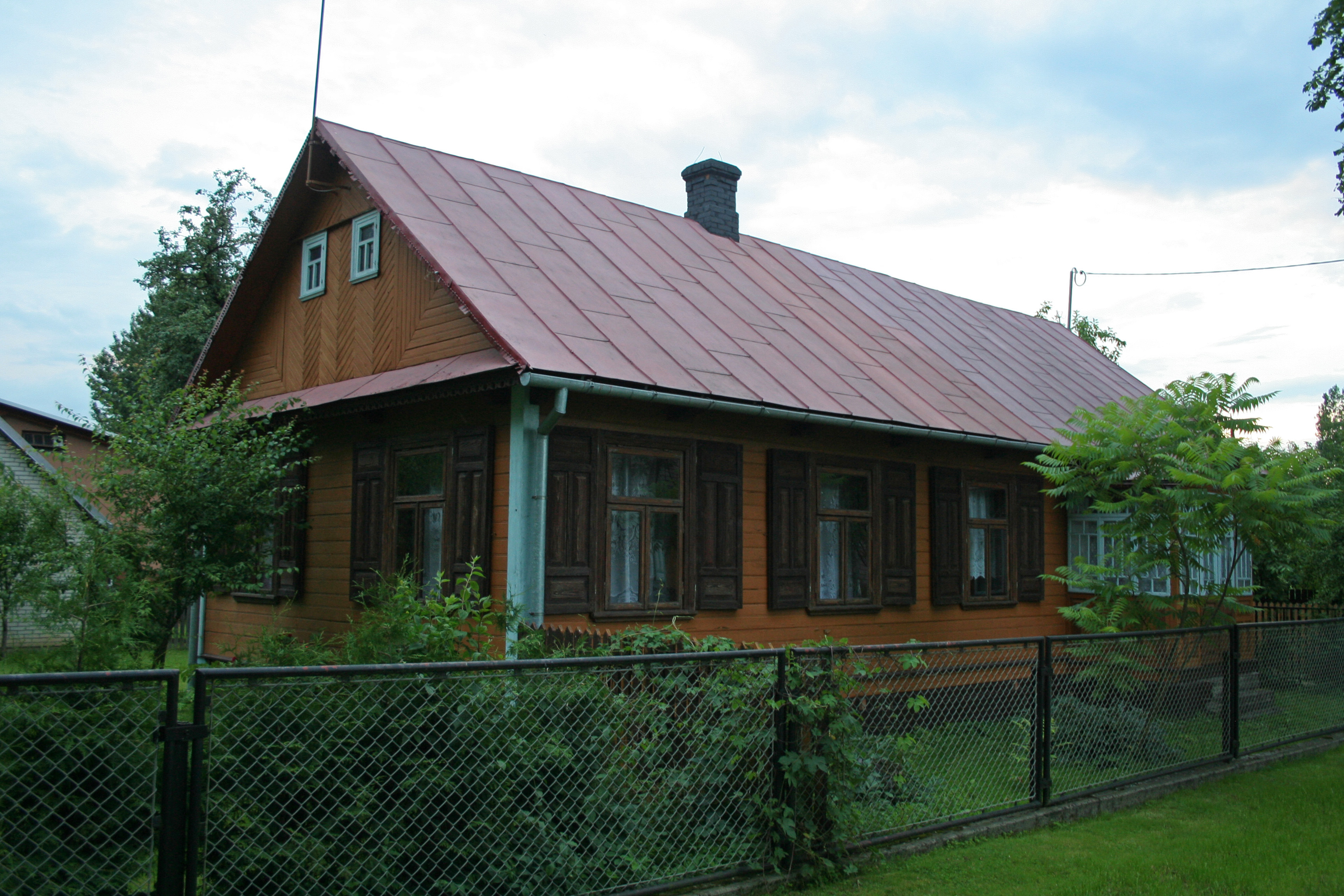
- House in Nowokornino

- Location within Poland
- Coordinates: 52°47′50″N 23°31′10″E
- Country: Poland
- Voivodeship: Podlaskie
- County: Hajnówka
- Gmina: Hajnówka

Nowokornino [nɔvɔkɔrˈninɔ] is a village in the administrative district of Gmina Hajnówka, within Hajnówka County, Podlaskie Voivodeship, in north-eastern Poland, close to the border with Belarus.
