= Bielszczyzna =

- Village
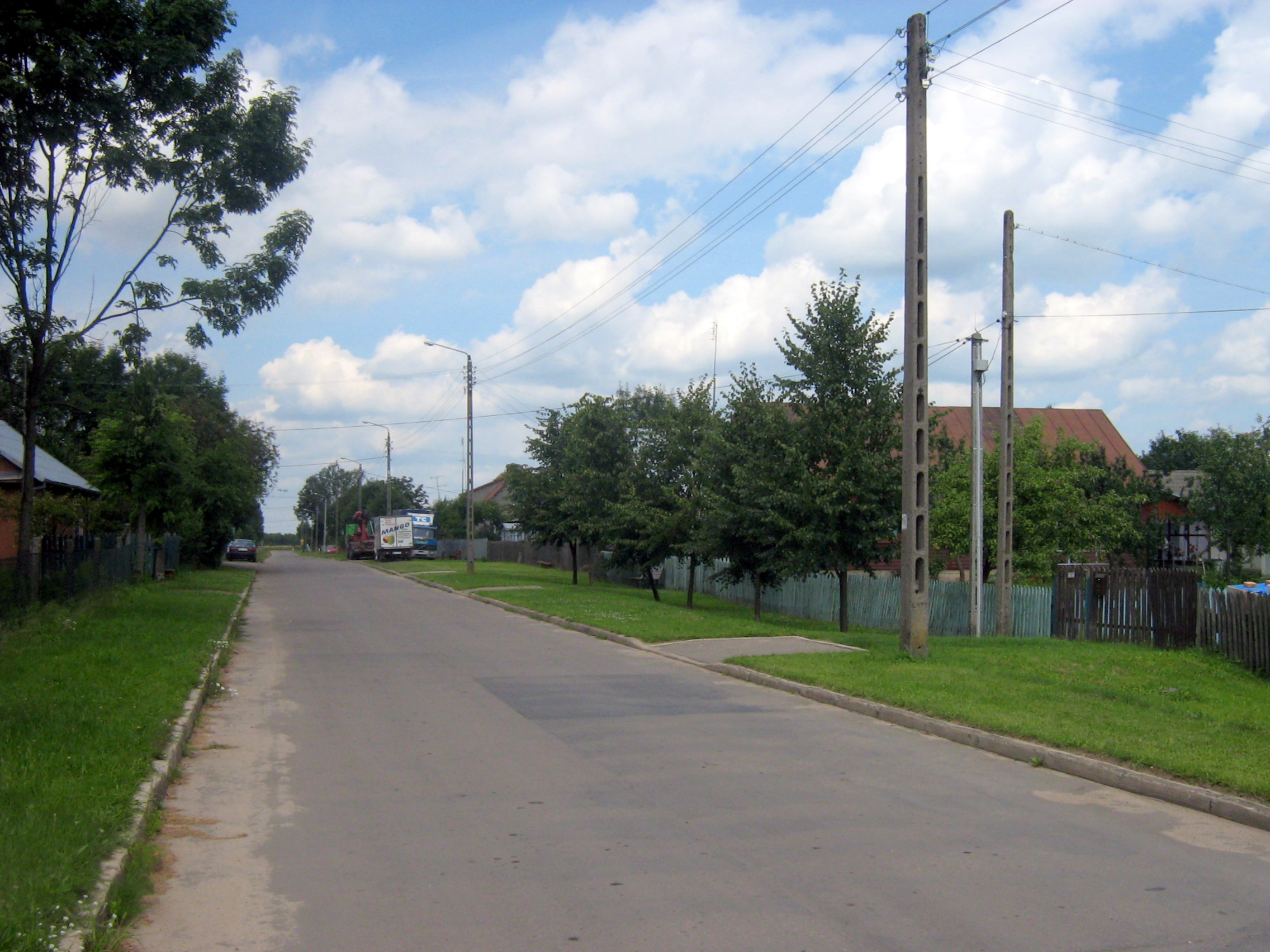
- Street in the village

- Location within Poland
- Coordinates: 52°45′56″N 23°34′11″E
- Country: Poland
- Voivodeship: Podlaskie
- County: Hajnówka
- Gmina: Hajnówka

Bielszczyzna [bʲɛlʂˈt͡ʂɨzna] is a village in the administrative district of Gmina Hajnówka, within Hajnówka County, Podlaskie Voivodeship, in north-eastern Poland, close to the border with Belarus.
