= Smolany Sadek =

- Village
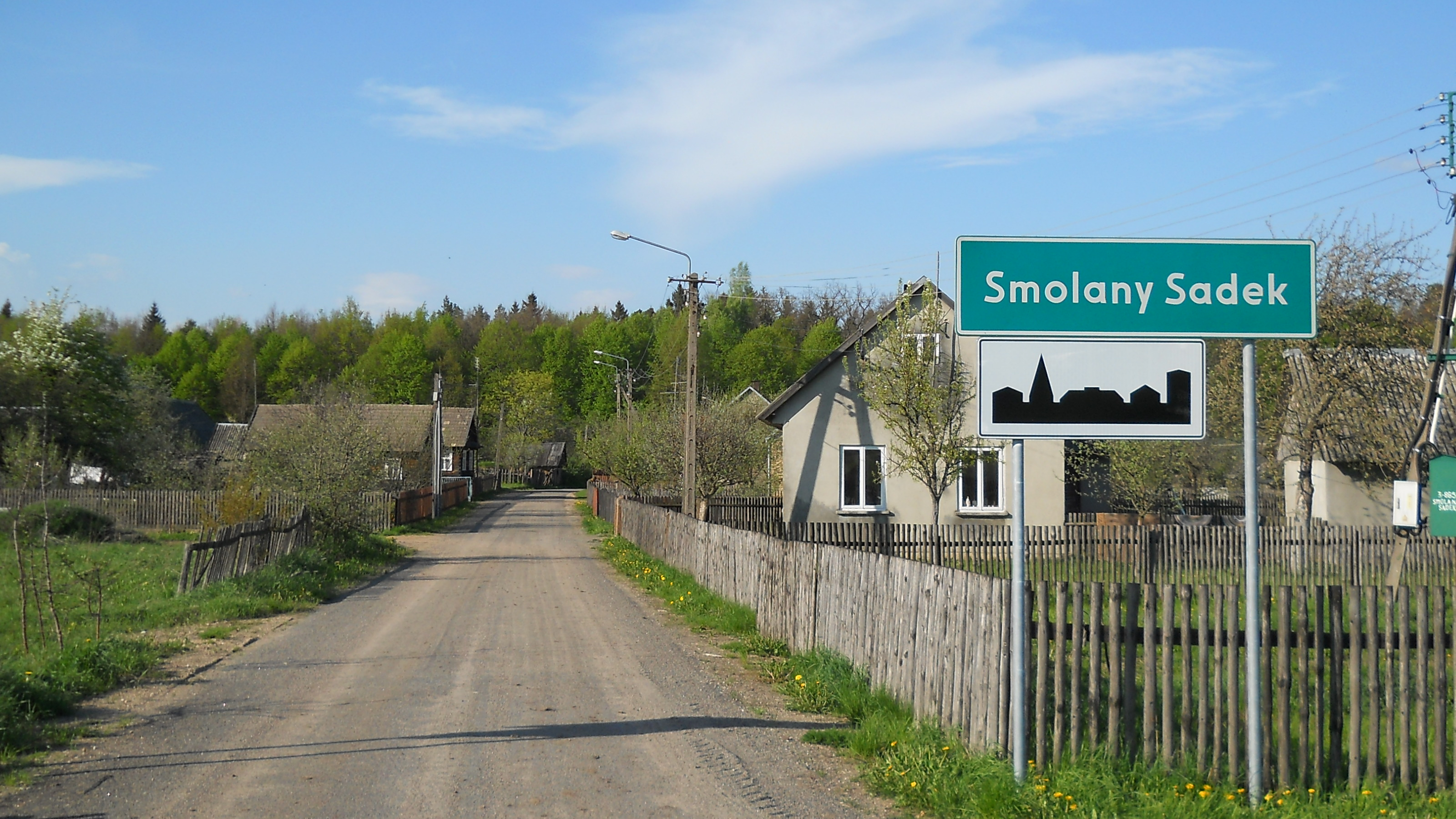

- Location within Poland
- Coordinates: 52°48′55″N 23°36′43″E
- Country: Poland
- Voivodeship: Podlaskie
- County: Hajnówka
- Gmina: Hajnówka

Smolany Sadek [smɔˈlanɨ ˈsadɛk] is a village in the administrative district of Gmina Hajnówka, within Hajnówka County, Podlaskie Voivodeship, in north-eastern Poland, close to the border with Belarus.
