= Bokówka, Podlaskie Voivodeship =

Bokówka
- Village
- Location within Poland
- Coordinates: 52°41′34″N 23°33′1″E
- Country: Poland
- Voivodeship: Podlaskie
- County: Hajnówka
- Gmina: Hajnówka

Bokówka [bɔˈkufka] is a village in the administrative district of Gmina Hajnówka, within Hajnówka County, Podlaskie Voivodeship, in north-eastern Poland, close to the border with Belarus.
