= Sorocza Nóżka =

- Village
- Location within Poland
- Coordinates: 52°47′34″N 23°37′4″E
- Country: Poland
- Voivodeship: Podlaskie
- County: Hajnówka
- Gmina: Hajnówka

Sorocza Nóżka [sɔˈrɔt͡ʂa ˈnuʂka] is a village in the administrative district of Gmina Hajnówka, within Hajnówka County, Podlaskie Voivodeship, in north-eastern Poland, close to the border with Belarus.
