= Nowosady, Hajnówka County =

Nowosady
- Village
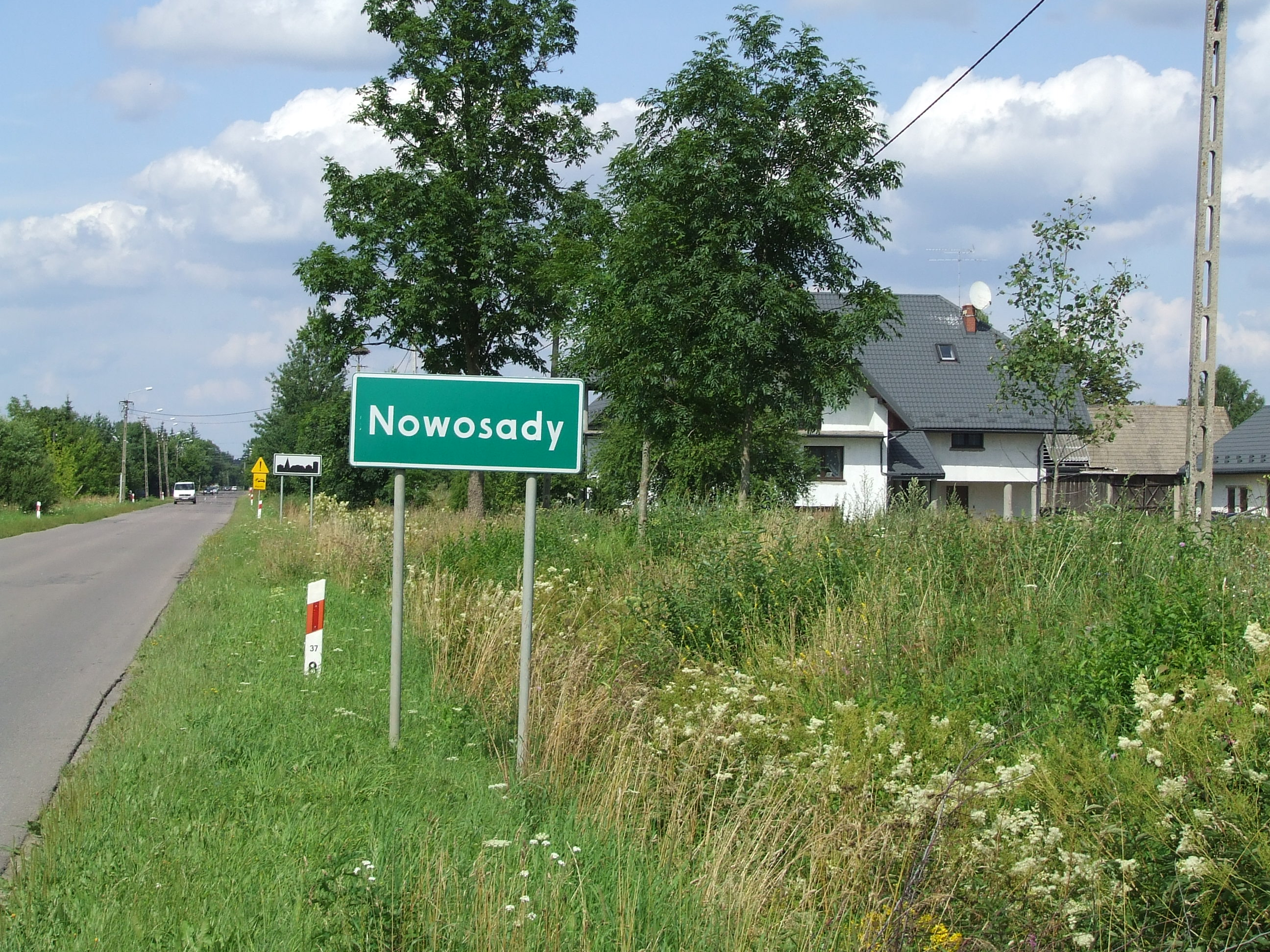

- Location within Poland
- Coordinates: 52°48′N 23°37′E
- Country: Poland
- Voivodeship: Podlaskie
- County: Hajnówka
- Gmina: Hajnówka
- Population: 500

Nowosady [nɔvɔˈsadɨ] is a village in the administrative district of Gmina Hajnówka, within Hajnówka County, Podlaskie Voivodeship, in north-eastern Poland, close to the border with Belarus.

The village was founded in the beginning of the 18th century (Rękopis Nr D.A. 11518, Wilno 1786). In 1786 in Nowosady lived 93 inhabitants, in 1861 — 300 inhabitants, in 1911 — 470 inhabitants.
