= Rakowicze, Hajnówka County =

Rakowicze
- Village
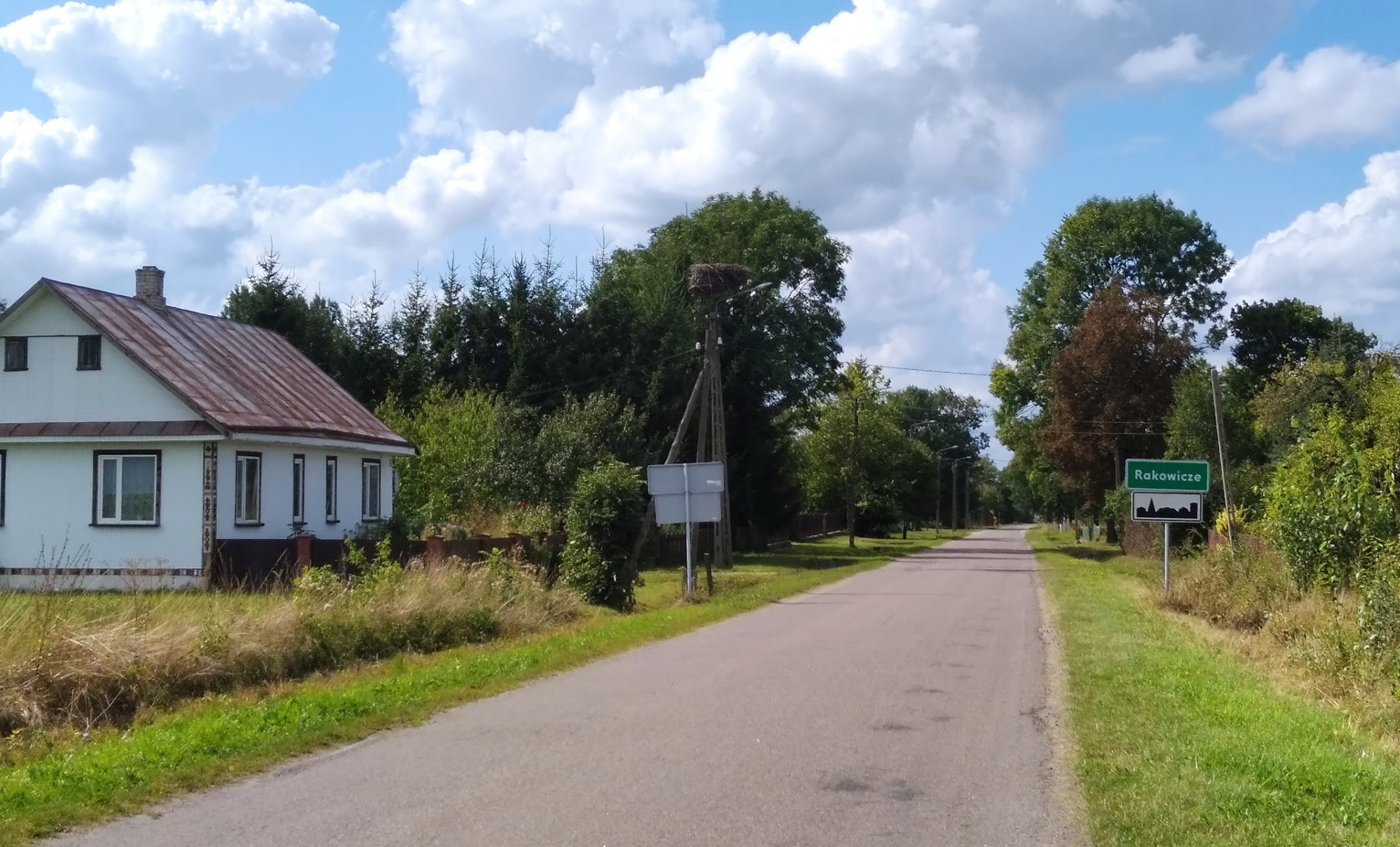

- Location within Poland
- Coordinates: 52°46′26″N 23°23′10″E
- Country: Poland
- Voivodeship: Podlaskie
- County: Hajnówka
- Gmina: Czyże

Rakowicze [rakɔˈvit͡ʂɛ] (Belarusian: Ракавічы, Podlachian: Rákovičy) is a village in the administrative district of Gmina Czyże, within Hajnówka County, Podlaskie Voivodeship, in north-eastern Poland.
