= Morze (disambiguation) =

Morze is a 1933 Polish film also known as The Sea.

Morze may also refer to:

- Morze, Hajnówka County, village in Podlaskie Voivodeship (north-east Poland)
- Morze, Siemiatycze County, village in Podlaskie Voivodeship (north-east Poland)

== People ==
- Frank Morze, Jr. (1933–2006), American football player
- Stacy Morze, American actress and musician
