= Czyże =

- Village
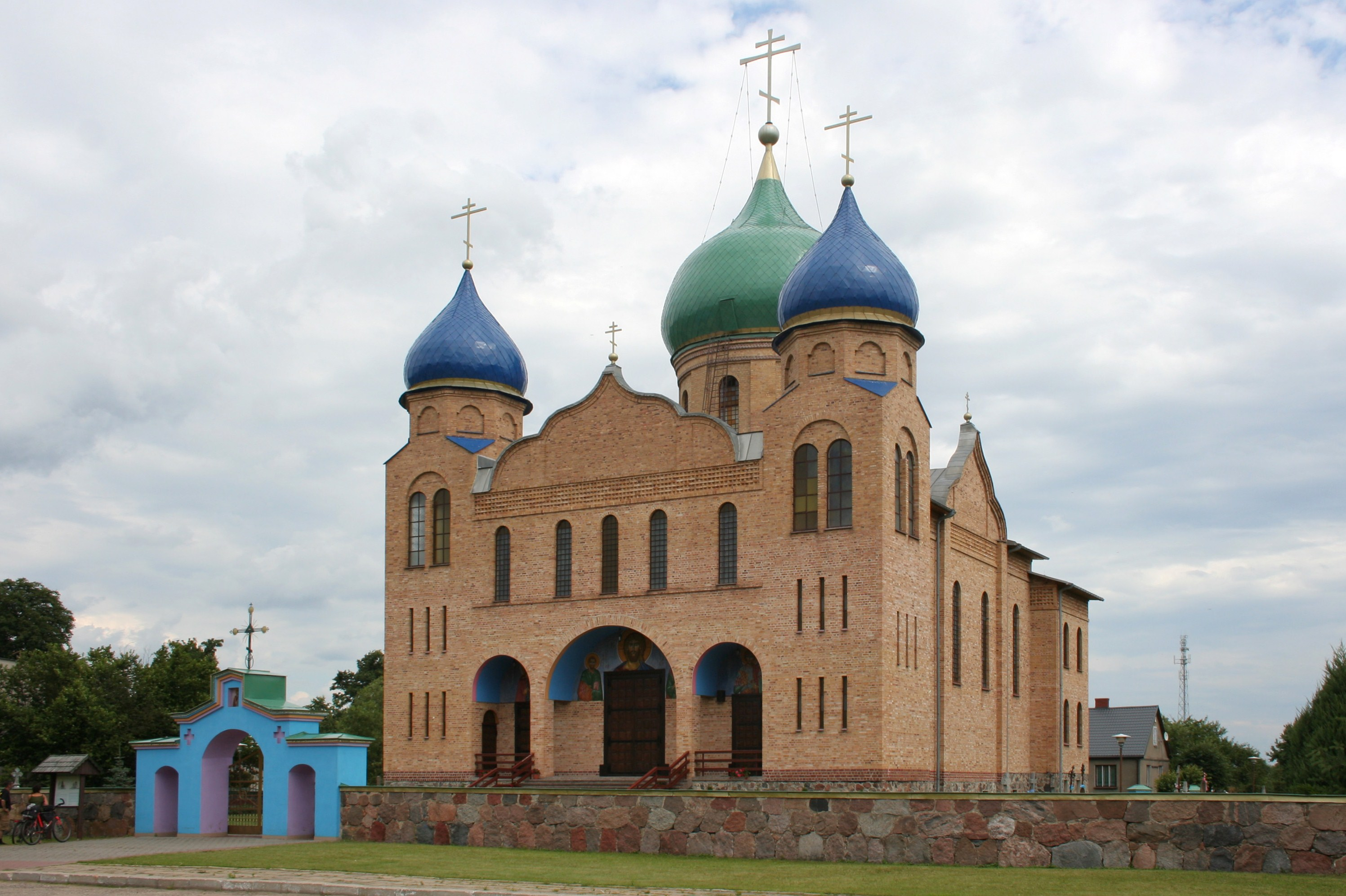
- Orthodox church

- Location within Poland
- Coordinates: 52°47′N 23°25′E
- Country: Poland
- Voivodeship: Podlaskie
- County: Hajnówka
- Gmina: Czyże
- Population (2006): 590
- Postal Code: 17-207
- Area Code: (+48) 85
- Vehicle registration: BHA

Czyże ([ˈt͡ʂɨʐɛ]; Belarusian: Чыжы, Čyžy; Podlachian: Čyžê) is a village in Hajnówka County, Podlaskie Voivodeship, in north-eastern Poland. It is the seat of the gmina (administrative district) called Gmina Czyże.

== History ==
The village was founded in the 16th century as a settlement in which the previously scattered beekeepers, osoczniki and royal riflemen, while the first mentions in documents date back to 1529. In the past the village was known as Czyżewicze.

The first Orthodox church in Czyże already existed in the 16th century. At the end of the 19th century, it still contained the original grants of Henryk Walezy from 1571, Michał Korybut from 1670 and Jan III from 1676. This church then accepted the union. In the 17th and 19th centuries, further religious buildings were erected in its place. The last of them contained a unique set of Baroque icons and wall paintings made by folk artists. This church was completely destroyed in 1984 as a result of arson. In 2014 bones from World War II were uncovered in archaeological excavations in the vicinity of the village.
