= Klejniki =

- Village
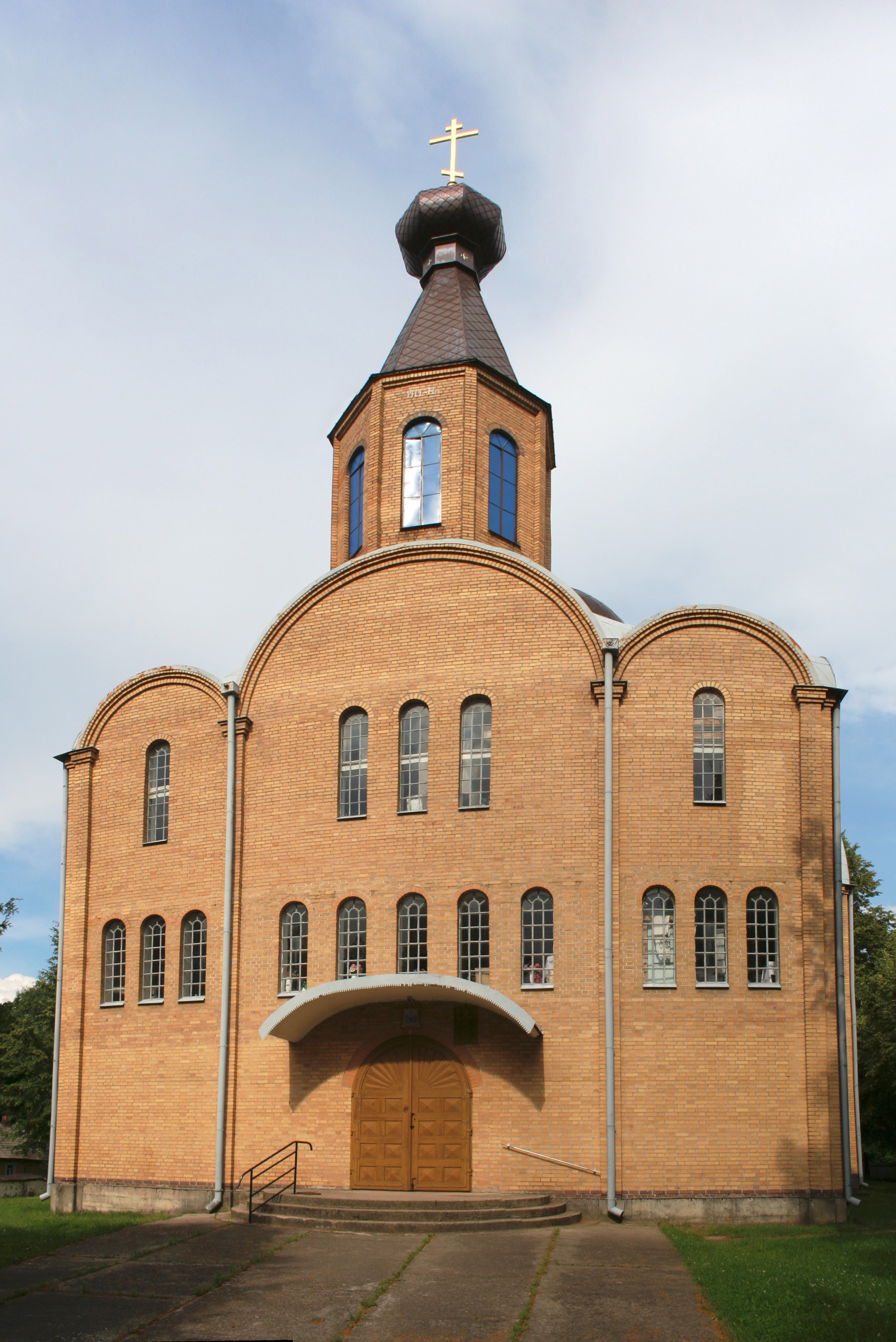

- Location within Poland
- Coordinates: 52°51′N 23°24′E
- Country: Poland
- Voivodeship: Podlaskie
- County: Hajnówka
- Gmina: Czyże

Klejniki [klɛi̯ˈɲikʲi] is a village in the administrative district of Gmina Czyże, within Hajnówka County, Podlaskie Voivodeship, in north-eastern Poland.

According to the 1921 census, the village was inhabited by 636 people, among whom 4 were Roman Catholic, 628 Orthodox, and 4 Mosaic. At the same time, 4 inhabitants declared Polish nationality, and 632 Belarusian. There were 128 residential buildings in the village.
