= Maksymowszczyzna =

- Village
- Location within Poland
- Coordinates: 52°48′30″N 23°27′30″E
- Country: Poland
- Voivodeship: Podlaskie
- County: Hajnówka
- Gmina: Czyże

Maksymowszczyzna [maksɨmɔfʂˈt͡ʂɨzna] is a village in the administrative district of Gmina Czyże, within Hajnówka County, Podlaskie Voivodeship, in north-eastern Poland.
