= Podlachian language =

East Slavic microlanguage

Podlachian
- Ethnicity: Podlashuks
- Language family: Indo-European: Balto-Slavic; Slavic; East Slavic; Podlachian
- Writing system: Latin Alphabet; Cyrillic Alphabet

Language codes
- ISO 639-3: –
- Glottolog: None
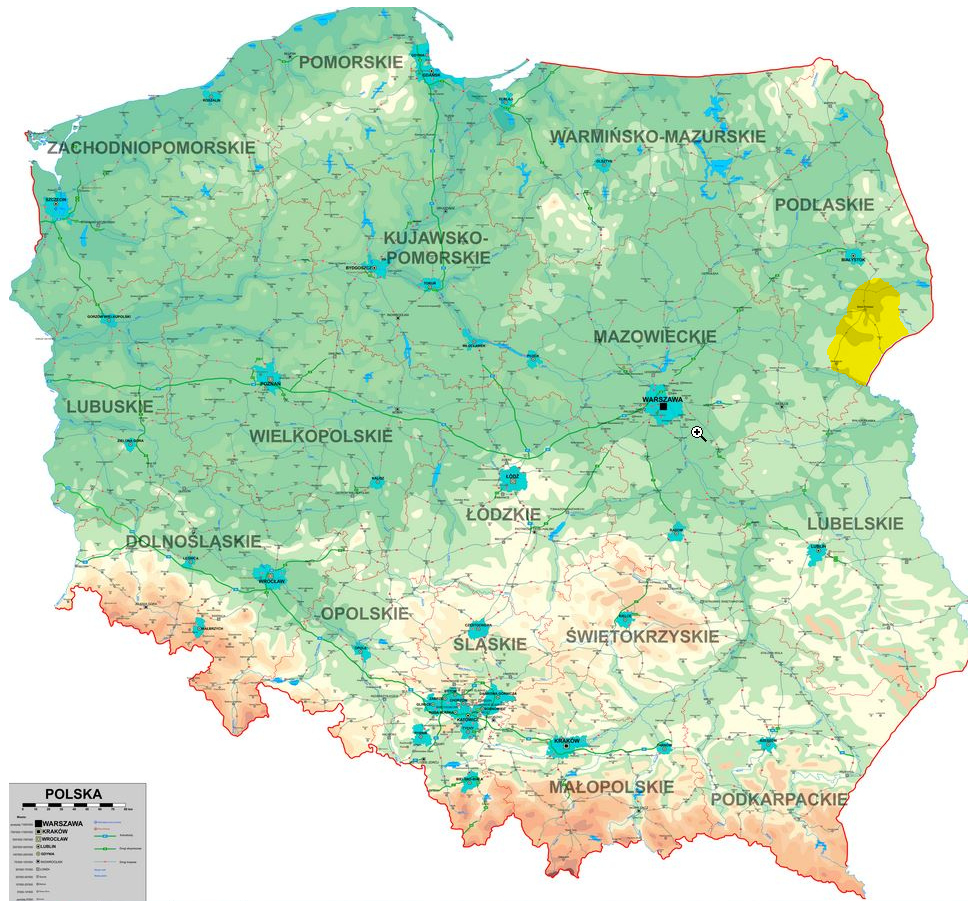

Podlachian language (pudlaśka mova) is an East Slavic literary microlanguage based on the East Slavic dialects spoken by inhabitants of the southern part of Podlachian Voivodeship (Polish: województwo podlaskie) in Poland between the Narew (north) and Bug (south) rivers. The native speakers of these dialects usually refer to them by the adverbial term po-svojomu (in our own language). The unequivocal academic classification of the po-svojomu dialects has been disputed for many years among linguists as well as activists of ethnic minorities in Podlachia (Polish: Podlasie), who classify them as either Belarusian dialects with Ukrainian traits or Ukrainian dialects.

== Name ==
The East Slavic dialects of Podlachia between the Narew and Bug rivers are perceived differently by their native speakers. According to an estimate made by Jan Maksymiuk, the author of a Podlachian language standardization project, on the basis of the 2002 census in Poland, some 32,000 people in Podlachia, who declared Belarusian ethnicity, identified these dialects as Belarusian ones. At the same time, about 1.5 thousand speakers opting for Ukrainian ethnic origin described the same dialects as Ukrainian. Jan Maksymiuk, who was born in Podlachia and identifies himself as an ethnic Belarusian, considers them a dialectal periphery of the Ukrainian language. He also claims that the Podlachian language standard proposed by him is “lexically, phonologically and morphologically more distant from the Ukrainian literary standard than, for example, the Lemko language in Poland or the Rusyn language in Slovakia”.

The term Podlachian language (pudlaśka mova) as the name for a standardized written language based on the East Slavic dialects between the Narew and Bug rivers was used for the first time by Jan Maksymiuk in the April 2005 issue of the monthly magazine Czasopis. Earlier, in the February issue of Czasopis Jan Maksymiuk announced that he would use a modified Latin alphabet for his Podlachian writing system. He was inspired to begin his orthographic project by the 1977 doctoral dissertation The vocabulary of the village of Kuraszewo near Hajnówka written by philologist Jan Pietruczuk under the supervision of well-known Polish Slavist Michał Łesiów.

== Geographical distribution ==
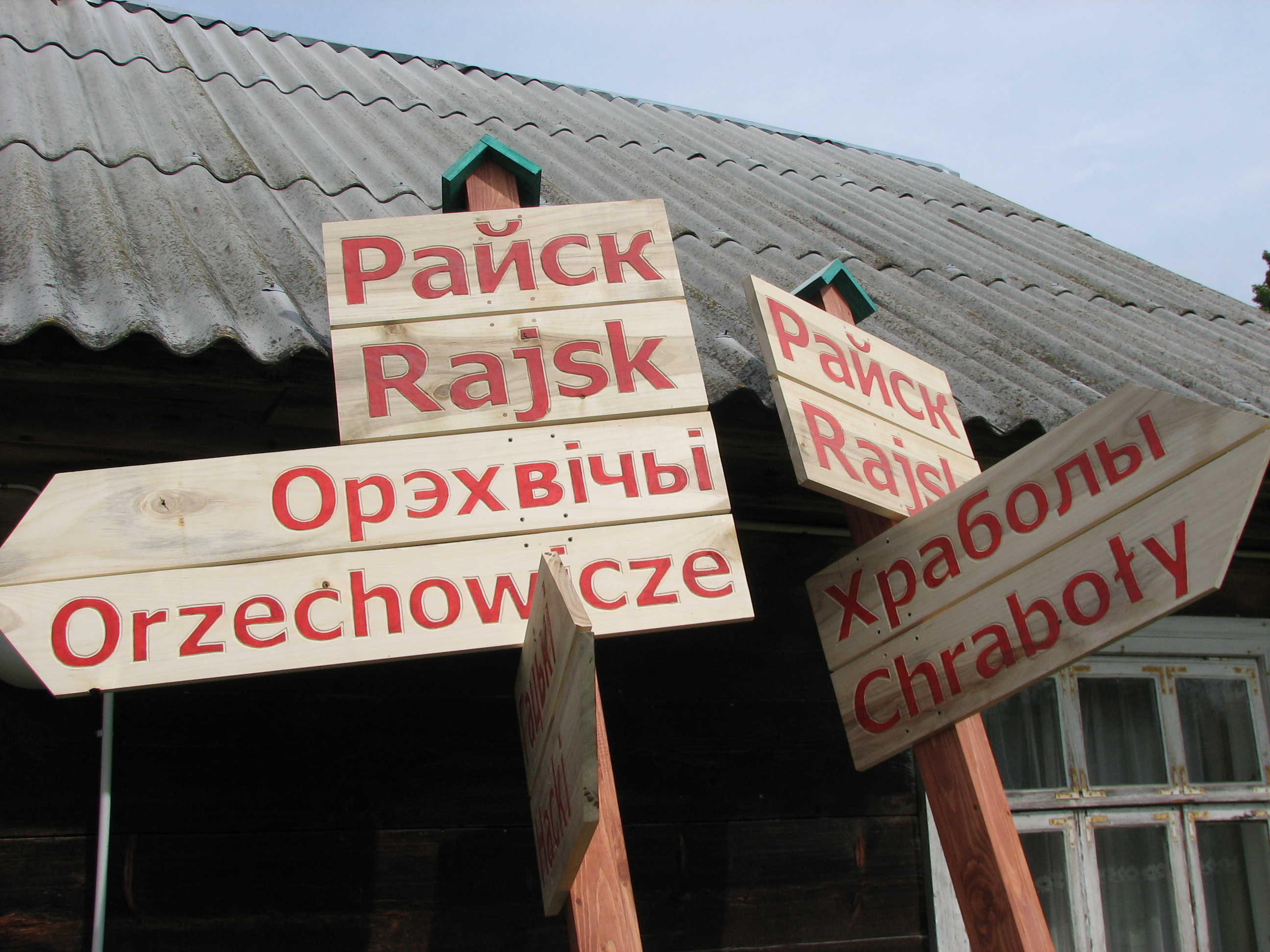
Tourist signs in Podlachian Cyrillic and Polish

The dialects taken as the basis for developing the standardized orthography and grammar of Podlachian are located in three counties (Polish: powiat) of Podlaskie Voivodeship: Bielsk County, Hajnówka County and Siemiatycze County. The rural communes (Polish: gmina) in which, according to the 2002 census, Belarusians constituted a majority or a significant percentage of their inhabitants include: Czyże (88.8%), Dubicze Cerkiewne (81.3%), Orla (68.9%), Hajnówka (64.9%), Narew (49.2%), Narewka (47.3%), Bielsk Podlaski (46.7%), Kleszczele (41.8%), Czeremcha (28.7%), Nurzec-Stacja (16.4%), Milejczyce (13.1%), Białowieża (11.5%). In the three district cities the percentage of Belarusians declared in 2002 was as follows: Hajnówka (26.4%), Bielsk Podlaski (20.7%), Siemiatycze (1.5%).

The written standard of Podlachian is based on East Slavic dialects in the communes of Narew, Czyże, Bielsk, Hajnówka (northern part), Boćki, Siemiatycze, Milejczyce (western part), Nurzec-Stacja (western part), which are characterized by the palatalization of dental consonants before the etymological [i] and the occurrence of three diphthongs: [^{u}o], [^{ɨ}e], [^{i}e]. This means that the standardized written system is based on the speech varieties with pronunciations like [xod^{j}it^{j}i], [z^{j}ima], [s^{j}iɫa], [k^{u}on^{j}], [r^{ɨ}eʒe], [s^{ji}em]. In the communes of Orla, Dubicze Cerkiewne, Kleszczele and Czeremcha the prevalent pronunciations are [xodɨtɨ], [zɨma], [sɨɫa], [k^{j}in^{j}], [r^{j}iʒe], [s^{j}im] and they were left outside the Podlachian standardization project by Jan Maksymiuk.

== Phonology ==
Following the road cleared by Jan Pietruczuk, Jan Maksymiuk identified 39 phonemes in Podlachian: 8 vowels and 31 consonants. Among the vowel phonemes there are two diphthongs (one of them has two allophones).

=== Vowels ===
==== Monophthongs ====
Monophthong phonemes
	Front	Central	Back
Close	i	ɨ	u
Mid	e		o
Open		a	

==== Diphthongs ====
- / ^{u}o/ is denoted in the orthography by <ô>.
- / ^{ɨ}e/ is denoted by ⟨ê⟩ and appears only in positions after the non-palatalizable consonants [ʃ], [ʒ], [ʧ], [ʤ], [r].
- / ^{i}e/ is denoted by ⟨iê⟩ and follows hard consonants which are palatalized.

=== Consonants ===
Podlachian Consonants
		Labial	Alveolar/Dental		Post-alveolar/Palatal	Velar
		Labial	plain	pal.	Post-alveolar/Palatal	Velar
Nasal		m	n	nʲ		
Stop	voiceless	p	t	tʲ		k
Stop	voiced	b	d	dʲ		ɡ
Affricate	voiceless		ts	tsʲ	tʃ	
Affricate	voiced		dz	dzʲ	dʒ	
Fricative	voiceless	f	s	sʲ	ʃ	x
Fricative	voiced	v	z	zʲ	ʒ	ɣ
Approximant		w	l, ɫ		j	
Trill			r			

== Orthography ==
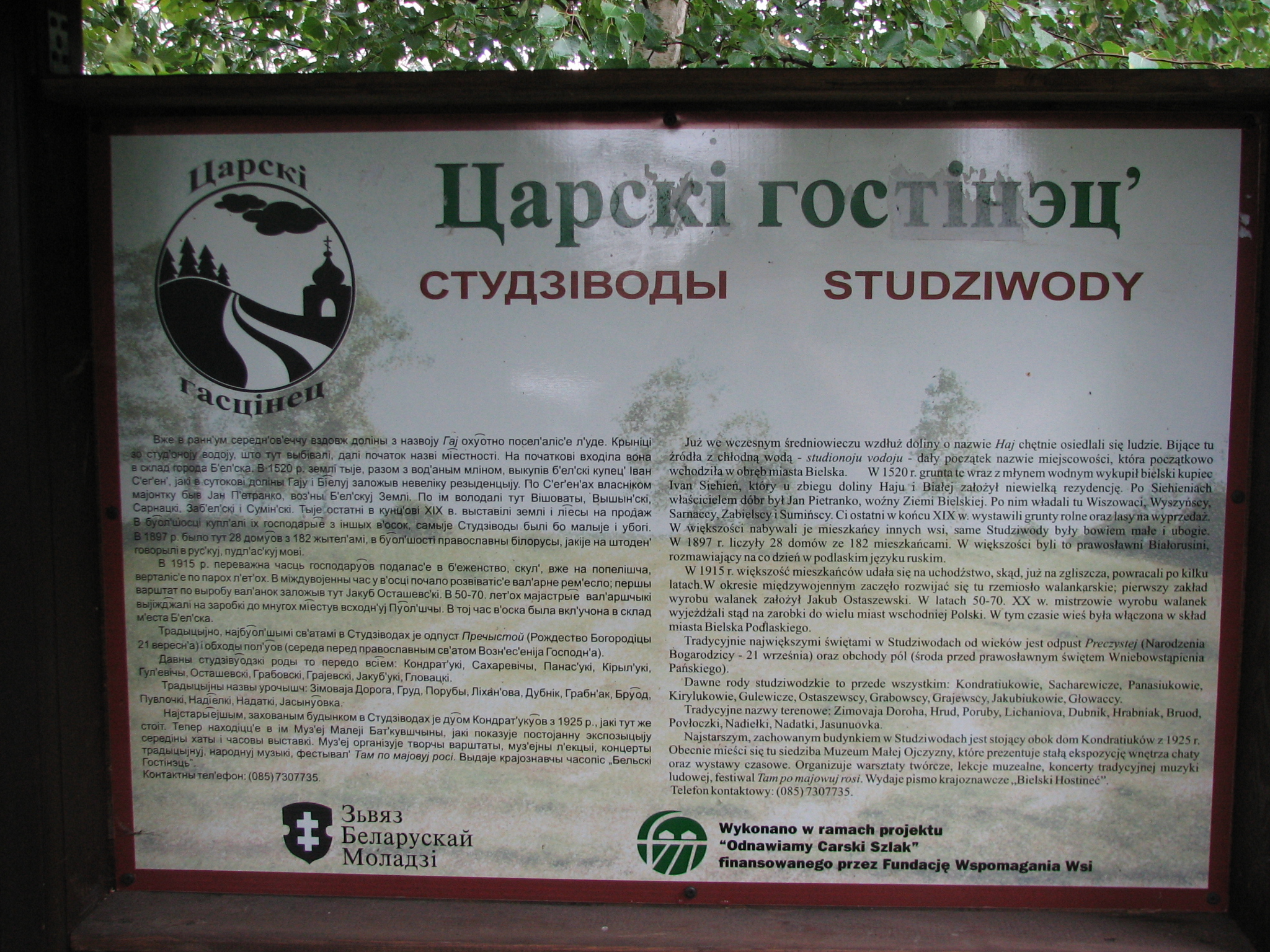
Information board in the Podlachian language, using its Belarusian Cyrillic-based orthography with Polish on the left

The Podlachian alphabet developed by Jan Maksymiuk is modelled on the so-called Belarusian Latin alphabet (Belarusian: беларуская лацінка): a Latin orthographic system that has been used sporadically for the past hundred years to spell the Belarusian language. The author of the Podlachian written standard added four graphemes to render in writing the specific Podlachian sounds that do not appear in Belarusian: ê, ô, ď, ť.

The correspondence between the Podlachian phonemes and graphemes is as follows: [i] – i, [ɨ] – y, [u] – u, [^{i}e] – iê, [^{ɨ}e] – ê, [^{u}o] – ô, [e] – e, [o] – o; [a] – a; [p] – p, [b] – b, [f] – f, [v] – v, [m] – m, [n] – n, [n^{j}] – ń, [t] – t, [d] – d, [t^{j}] – ť, [d^{j}] – ď, [ǳ] – dz, [ǳ^{j}] – dź, [ts] – c, [ts^{j}] – ć, [s] – s, [s^{j}] – ś, [z] – z, [z^{j}] – ź, [l] – l, [ɫ] – ł, [ʃ] – š, [ʒ] – ž, [tʃ] – č, [dʒ] – dž, [r] – r, [j] – j, [k] – k, [ɡ] – g, [x] – ch, [ɣ] – h.

The above set of graphemes has been supplemented with the symbols q, x, w to render in Podlachian foreign proper names using these letters.

Thus, the Podlachian alphabet consists of 43 graphemes, 5 of which are digraphs: A a, B b, C c, Ć ć, Č č, D d, Dz dz, Dź dź, Dž dž, Ď ď, E e, Ê ê, F f, G g, H h, Ch ch, I i, IÊ iê, J j, K k, L l, Ł ł, M m, N n, Ń ń, O o, Ô ô, P p, Q q, R r, S s, Ś ś, Š š, T t, Ť ť, U u, V v, W w, X x, Y y, Z z, Ź ź, Ž ž .

== Some orthographic issues ==
=== Palatalization of consonants ===
Palatalization in Podlachian, as in Polish, is denoted by inserting i between the palatalized consonant and the following vowel: biêły, jiciê, jiciom, diuha, dziavkati, dziubak, giez, hieroj, niuch, spotkanie, niôs, sioło, porosia, kołôsie, tiota, ziachati.

If the palatalized consonant is followed by another consonant or stands in a final position, then, similarly to the Polish language, a symbol with a diacritic sign is used: ń, ś, ź, ć, ť, ď. Examples: kôń, łôńśki, ôśka, maź, kuneć, ťma, miêď.

The Podlachian alphabet, like the Belarusian Latin one, uses the symbol ł for a dental-alveoral lateral consonant and the symbol l for its palatalized companion. Although the symbol l represents a palatalized consonant, Jan Maksymiuk adopted the orthographic convention in which the grapheme i is inserted between l and the diphthong ê. Examples: liês (not: lês), liêto (not: lêto), pliêška (not: plêška). If the consonant [l^{j}] is followed by a vowel or stands in a final position, the grapheme i is not used: ležati, lis, lôd, lakati, lubiti, môl.

A similar device is used for the notation of the consonant [j] preceding the diphthong ê: jiêsti (not: jêsti), jiêchati (not: jêchati).

=== Semivowel [w] and phonemes [v], [u] ===
The Podlachian vowel [u] in unstressed syllables may alternate in speech with the semivowel [w] or the consonant [v] without affecting the meaning of a word. Although there is no consistency in this alternation in Podlachian dialects, the standard orthography regularizes it by putting the grapheme u in the absolute beginning of a phrase, after a pause or after a consonant. The grapheme v is written following a vowel or preceding a consonant, either within a word or at a word boundary. The standardized orthography represents the semivowel [w] in writing as either u or v according to the above-mentioned rules. Examples: vona vmiêje, Kola vkrav, stary včytel, vôn umiêje, susiêd ukrav, pohovoryv z učytelom, uže pryjšli, učora zadoščyło, byv u liêsi, chołod u pohrebi, žyła v Varšavi, mjahko v posteli, u Pôlščy, u kišeni, davni, povny, machav, siêv.

=== Iotation ===
In Podlachian the consonant [j] may optionally appear before the vowel [i] at the beginning of a word or within it following an open syllable. In some cases iotation is denoted in spelling: jich, jim, jichni, jijiê, Ukrajina, krojiti, bojisko, mojich, svojich, odnoji, druhoji. However, for the overwhelming majority of Podlachian words beginning with [i] iotation is not reproduced in writing: ihołka, ihra, ikona, ikra, inačej, inžyniêr, iskra, iti, izolacija.

Iotation also occurs before other vowels (ô, iê, a, u, e) after the consonants v, b, m, p, and in these cases it is mandatory to put j in spelling: vjôv, sołovjiê, vjazati, vju, vje, vorobjiê, žerebja, bju, bje, mjav, mjôv, beremje, pjôk, pjatnicia, pju, pje.

== Sample of Podlachian text in standardized orthography ==
Bołota roztiahalisie pomiž Ploskami i Knorozami. Mama mniê rozkazuvała, što koliś tudoju było velmi tiažko projti, možna było provalitisie v bahno i vže ne vylizti. Potum tam była takaja piščanaja doroha, ale koli môcno zadoščyło, to jijiê zatopluvało. Teper vyhoda, zalili asfalt, projiêdeš i prôjdeš suchoju nohoju. I je tam liês, u kotorum rostut poziômki. Ja koliś namoviła odnu koležanku z Ploskuv i my pujšli tudy nazbirati poziômkuv. Najiêstisie my najiêlisie, ale dodomu ničoho ne prynesli. Ono mati Irenki vže biêhała po seliê i šukała dočki, bo nas dovoli dovho ne było. I posli dovho ne pozvolała nam razom bavitisie. Hovoryła, što tôj Halinci to durnyje dumki v hołovu prychodiat, bo, vjadomo, z miêsta. A moja baba naveť uvahi ne zvernuła na toje, što jeji vnučka kudyś propała i puv dnia ne była doma.

Translation:

The marshes stretched from Ploski to Knorozy. Mother told me that at an earlier time it was very hard to walk there, you could get bogged down and stay stuck in there forever. Afterward there was a sandy road but it was repeatedly inundated during rains. Now they have built an asphalt road, such a convenience, you can walk or drive there without fear of getting bogged down. There is also a wood with wild strawberries. Once I talked a friend from Ploski into going and gathering wild strawberries there. We did eat a lot of them on the spot but came home empty-handed. In the meantime my friend Irenka’s mother was running about the village and looking for her daughter. For a long time after that she did not allow us to play together. She used to say that Halinka has silly ideas as, naturally, is the case with other city girls. As for my grandma, she did not pay any attention to the fact that her granddaughter had disappeared and been missing from home for half a day.

== Major differences between Podlachian and Ukrainian ==
1. Basic phonological difference: Podlachian has 39 phonemes (8 vowels and 31 consonants), while Ukrainian has 38 phonemes (6 vowels and 32 consonants). The Podlachian phonemic inventory includes the diphthongs [^{u}o] and [^{i}e]/[^{ɨ}e] which are not found in Ukrainian. Ukrainian has the phoneme [r^{j}] which does not occur in Podlachian.

2. Ikavism a, one of the most characteristic phonological phenomena in the Ukrainian language, does not occur in Podlachian in stressed syllables and appears only rarely in unstressed ones. Examples of the lack of ikavism in stressed syllables: kôń (Ukr. кінь), zôrka (зірка), miêsto (місто), diêd (дід). Examples of the lack of ikavism in unstressed syllables: kunéć (кінець), nučliêh (нічліг), pudvestí (підвести), čóbut (чобіт). Examples of the rare occurrence of ikavism in unstressed syllables: pisók (пісок), svitíti (світити), simjá (сім’я).

3. The consonants [b], [p], [v], [d], [t], [m], [z], [s] before the etymological [i] are non-palatalized in Ukrainian, in Podlachian they are pronounced as palatal: biti (бити), piti (пити), vidno (видно), divo (диво), ticho (тихо), miska (миска), zima (зима), siła (сила).

4. Podlachian does not have the doubled consonants [l^{j}], [n^{j}], [t^{j}], [d^{j}], [s^{j}], [z^{j}], [ʃ], [ʒ], [tʃ] as is the case with Ukrainian: весілля (Podlachian: vesiêle), хотіння (chotiênie), бриття (brytie), груддю (hrudieju), Полісся (Poliêsie), маззю (mazieju), Підляшшя (Pudlaše), Запоріжжя (Zaporôže), заріччя (zarêče).

5. The consonant [ɡ] in Podlachian is much more common than in Ukrainian. Examples of preserving the consonant [ɡ] in Podlachian dialects: basałyga, čemergies, galoš, gandoryti, ganok, gaznik, giegnuti, grunt, gudziati, gula, gałušyti, kolega, ogaračyti, vagovati.

6. In Podlachian the endings of adjectives in feminine and neuter gender are of two types – either unstressed and short (biêła, biêłe, vysóka, vysókie) or stressed and long (chudája, chudóje, małája, małóje). In Ukrainian endings of feminine and neuter adjectives are most commonly short, regardless of the position of the stress: бíла, бíле, висóка, висóке, худá, худé, малá, малé, however long endings can optionally be used poetically: бі́лая, си́нєє.

7. The Podlachian present participle has the suffixes -uščy, -iuščy, -aščy, -iaščy (rostuščy, smerdiuščy, movčaščy, chodiaščy), while the Ukrainian one has the endings -учий, -ючий, -ачий, -ячий ( несучий, оновлюючий, дрижачий, киплячий).

8. Podlachian local dialects have preserved the dual grammatical number up to the present day for a number of feminine and neuter nouns. Podlachian dual, which has forms differing from Podlachian plural in the nominative and accusative cases, occurs with the numerals dviê, try, štyry: kovbasiê (plural: kovbásy), kosiê (plural: kósy), kolasiê (plural: kolósa), liciê (plural: lícia), liêti (plural: litá), okniê (plural: ókna), koliêni (plural: koliná), seliê (plural: séła), koliêno — koliêni (plural: koliná); sviáto — sviáti (plural: sviatá). Such dual forms are nonexistent in Ukrainian. Different forms of dual are also noted for a number of masculine, feminine and neuter nouns in the instrumental case: chłopcíma (plural: chłópciami), sviníma (svíniami), hrošýma (hróšami). Such morphological forms with the stressed suffixes -íma (-ýma) do not appear in Ukrainian.

Using the methods of glottochronology developed by American linguist Morris Swadesh (and modified subsequently by Russian linguist Sergei Starostin), Jan Maksymiuk made an attempt to estimate the time when Podlachian and Ukrainian diverged. According to his calculations, it could have happened within the years 1350–1450. He commented on this result as follows:

[The estimate] is perfectly acceptable. What event between 1350 and 1450 could initiate the divergence of Podlachian and Ukrainian? Obviously the colonization of North Podlachia by settlers from Volhynia. It was at the turn of the 14th and 15th centuries that this area, vacated by Jatvingians, began to be populated with Volhynian settlers in newly founded villages. At that time, as suggested by common sense, the peripheral dialect of settlers from Volhynia, which served as the basis for developing today's standardized (literary) version of Podlachian, began to move away from the dialect/dialects of central Ukraine, which was/were used to construct the modern Ukrainian language.

=== Word examples ===
English	Belarusian	Polish	Ukrainian	Podlachian
what	што	co	що	što
when	калі	kiedy	коли	koli
something	нешта/штось/штосьці	coś	щось	štoś
he	ён	on	він	vôn
only	толькі	tylko	тільки	tôlko
which	які/каторы	który	який/котрий	kotory
about	пра	o	про	pro
more	больш/болей	więcej	більше	bôlš
home	дом	dom	дім	dôm

== Literature in Podlachian ==
Texts in Podlachian are currently published in magazines of the Belarusian ethnic minority, the monthly Czasopis and the yearly Bielski Hostineć, as well as in Nad Buhom i Narwoju, a bimonthly of the Ukrainian ethnic minority in Podlachia. The texts are published in various orthographies that utilize both Cyrillic and Latin scripts. A review of various orthographic strategies in Podlachia and their evaluation can be found in the papers by Jan Maksymiuk published by Cambridge Scholars Publishing and Peter Lang. According to Jan Maksymiuk, the first author who began using Podlachian for literary purposes was Ukrainian-Belarusian ethnographer, folklorist and writer Mikołaj Jańczuk (1859-1921) born in the village of Kornica in Podlachia (now Stara Kornica in Poland’s Mazovian Province).

The contemporary authors writing in Podlachian include Doroteusz Fionik (editor of Bielski Hostineć), Jerzy Hawryluk (editor of Nad Buhom i Narwoju), Jan Maksymiuk (co-founder and editor of the Svoja.org website devoted to the Podlachian language), Aleksander Maksymiuk (co-founder and administrator of the Svoja.org website), Wiktor Stachwiuk, Zoja Saczko, Halina Maksymiuk, Barbara Goralczuk and several other people. At various times in the past, literary texts in Podlachian dialects were published by Irena Borowik, Jan Kiryziuk, Eugenia Żabińska and Justyna Korolko.

There has been a dozen books published in Podlachian in recent years, among them: a collection of poetry by Zoja Saczko Poká; two collections of memoirs by Halina Maksymiuk, Biêlśk, Knorozy, Ploski (i inšy vjoski) and Môj čeśki film; two collections of historical essays by Doroteusz Fionik, Mіеста в гісторыji і кул’туры пудл´ашскіх біелорусув and Беженство. Дорога і повороты 1915–1922, and a biography, Ярослав Васільевіч Костыцэвіч; two collections of fairy tales translated by Jan Maksymiuk, Kazki po-svojomu and Kazki Andersena dla starych i małych.

Moreover, in 2019–2020 Wiktor Stachwiuk serialized on his Facebook page a novel in Podlachian, Подых Тэмры. Том І. Somewhat earlier Wiktor Stachwiuk published in Podlachian Siva zozula, an ethnographic essay on his native village of Trześcianka, and a collection of poems Bahrovy tień (Podlachian originals with translations in Belarusian).
