= Kojły =

- Village
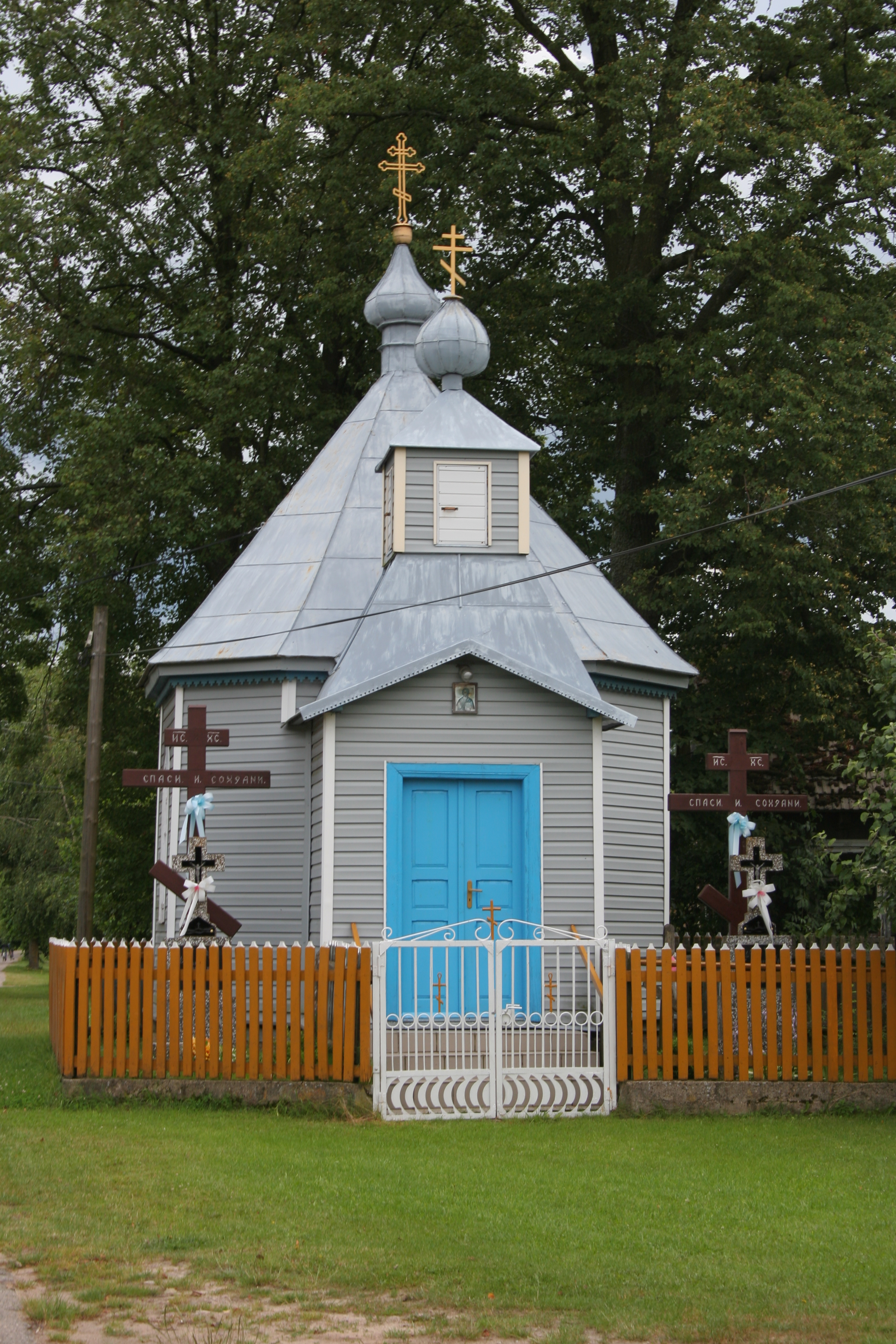
- Saint Alexis Orthodox chapel

- Location within Poland
- Coordinates: 52°47′N 23°29′E
- Country: Poland
- Voivodeship: Podlaskie
- County: Hajnówka
- Gmina: Czyże

Kojły [ˈkɔi̯wɨ] is a village in the administrative district of Gmina Czyże, within Hajnówka County, Podlaskie Voivodeship, in north-eastern Poland.

According to the 1921 census, the village was inhabited by 386 people, among whom 380 Orthodox, and 6 Mosaic. At the same time, all inhabitants declared Belarusian nationality. There were 84 residential buildings in the village.
