= Wólka, Hajnówka County =

Wólka
- Village
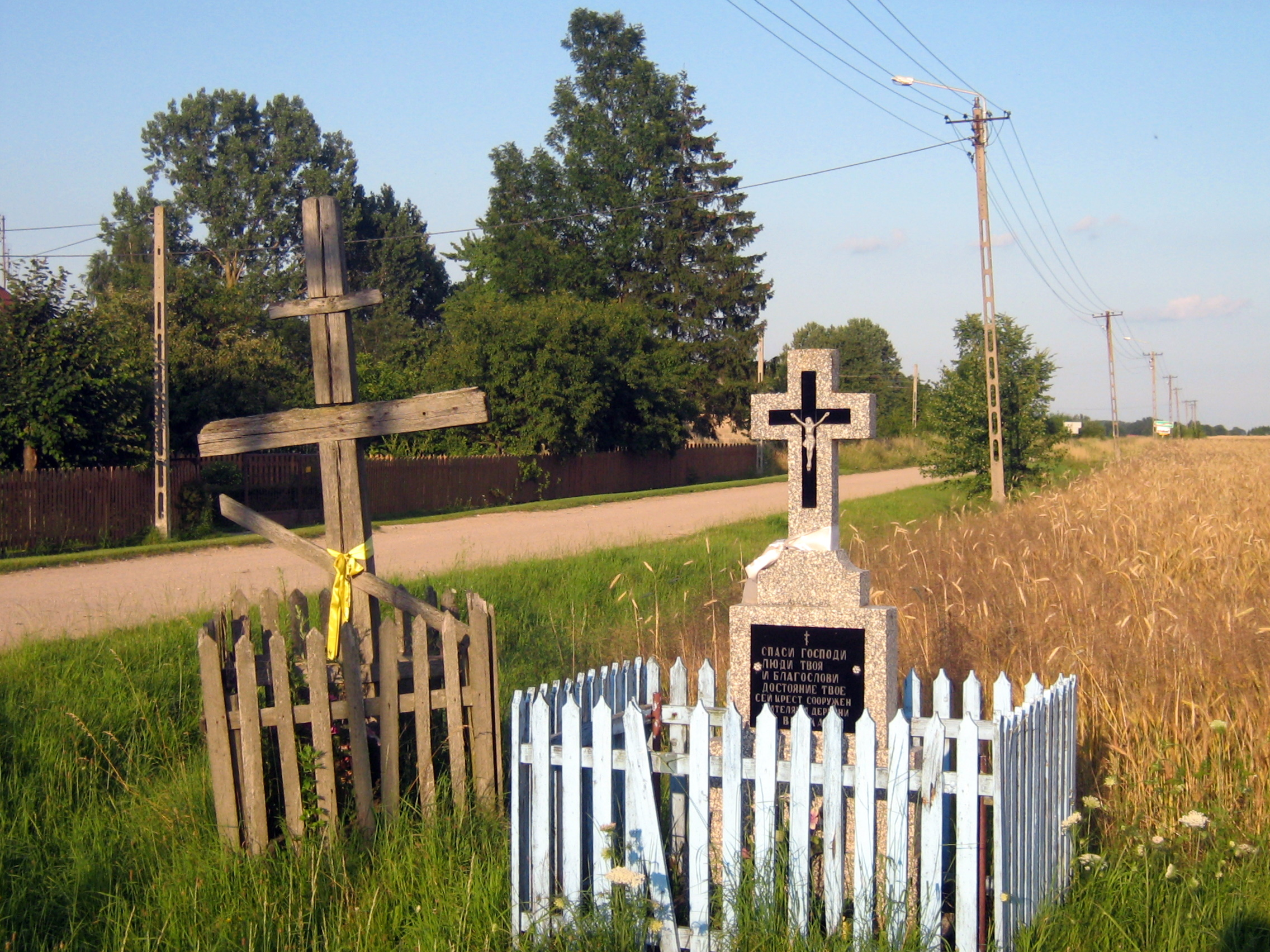
- Orthodox crosses in Wólka

- Location within Poland
- Coordinates: 52°49′05″N 23°30′27″E
- Country: Poland
- Voivodeship: Podlaskie
- County: Hajnówka
- Gmina: Czyże

Wólka [ˈvulka] is a village in the administrative district of Gmina Czyże, within Hajnówka County, Podlaskie Voivodeship, in north-eastern Poland.
