= Hukowicze =

- Village
- Location within Poland
- Coordinates: 52°51′N 23°20′E
- Country: Poland
- Voivodeship: Podlaskie
- County: Hajnówka
- Gmina: Czyże

Hukowicze [xukɔˈvʲit͡ʂɛ] is a village in the administrative district of Gmina Czyże, within Hajnówka County, Podlaskie Voivodeship, in north-eastern Poland.
