= Podwieżanka =

- Village
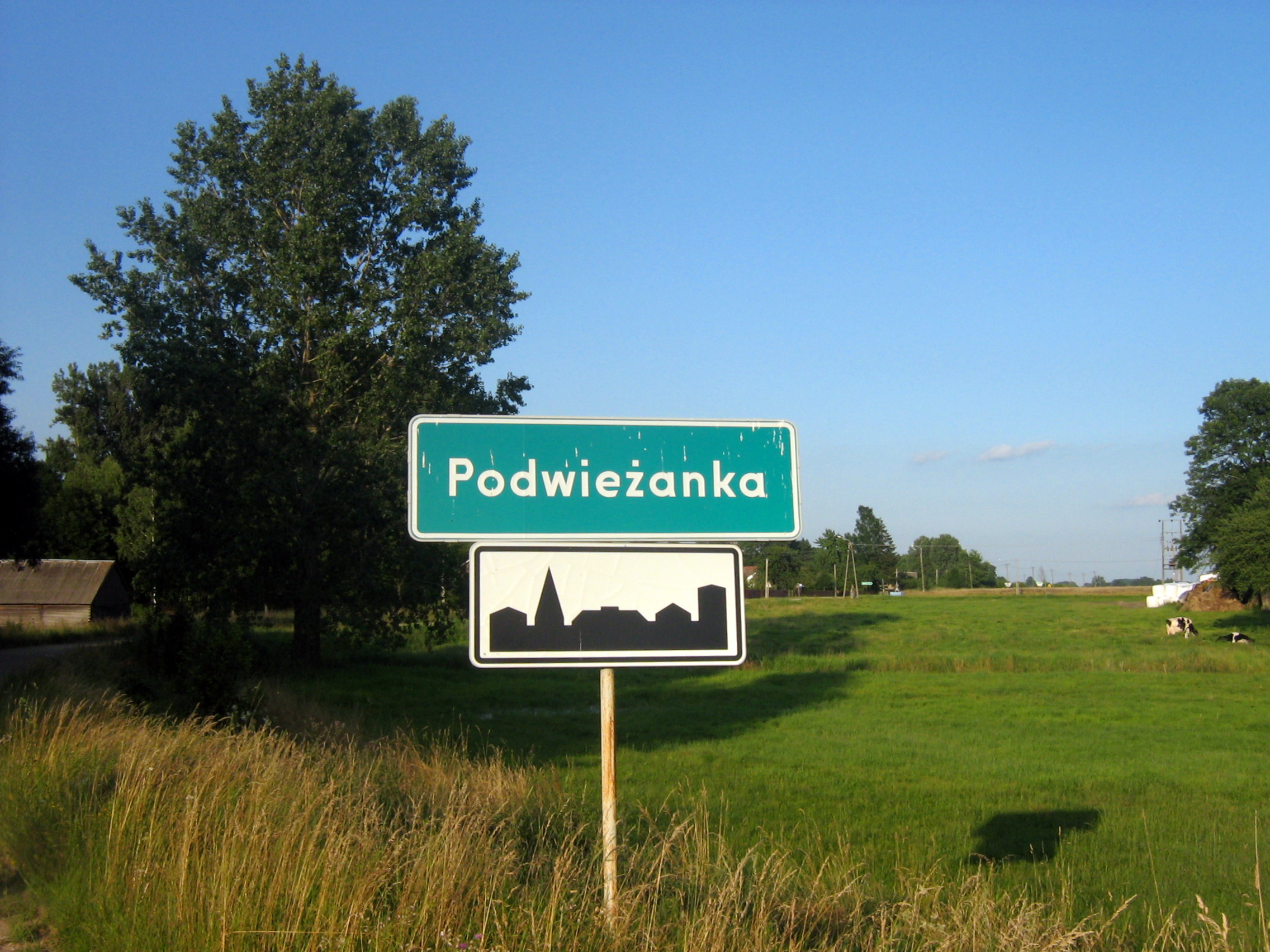

- Location within Poland
- Coordinates: 52°47′45″N 23°28′15″E
- Country: Poland
- Voivodeship: Podlaskie
- County: Hajnówka
- Gmina: Czyże

Podwieżanka [pɔdvjɛˈʐaŋka] is a village in the administrative district of Gmina Czyże, within Hajnówka County, Podlaskie Voivodeship, in north-eastern Poland.
