= Lady, Podlaskie Voivodeship =

Lady
- Village
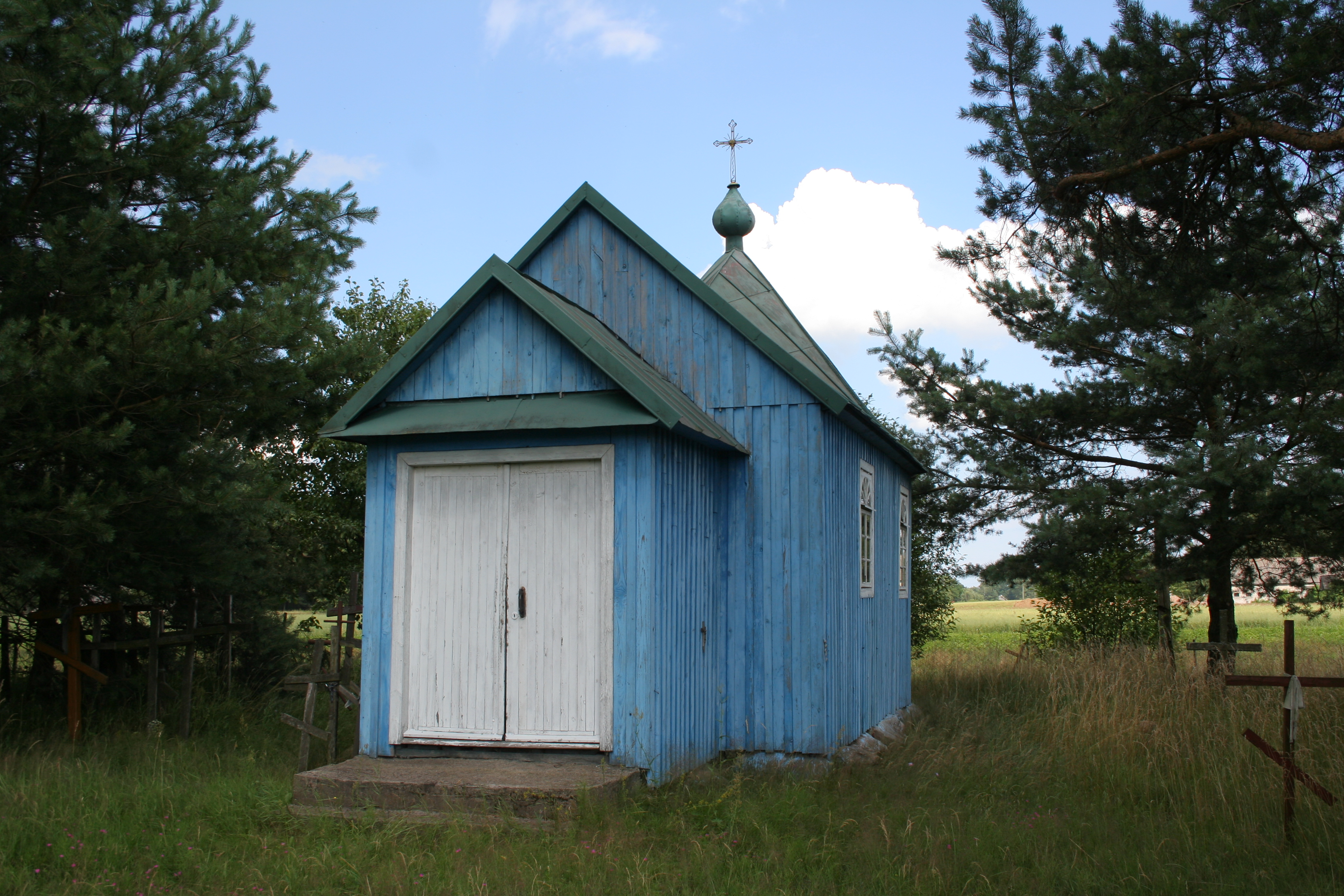

- Location within Poland
- Coordinates: 52°49′N 23°27′E
- Country: Poland
- Voivodeship: Podlaskie
- County: Hajnówka
- Gmina: Czyże

Lady [ˈladɨ] is a village in the administrative district of Gmina Czyże, within Hajnówka County, Podlaskie Voivodeship, in north-eastern Poland.

== History ==
The village is located on the site of a manor farm founded in 1559. The manor in Lady was described in 1576:

in this Bielsk forestry, the manor in Lady, of which the manor is measured at 9 hectares of average ground, of which 3 hectares are ploughed for the upbringing of the forester, and the subjects in service hold 6 hectares. To this manor is a backwater of 20 free morgas, to these hectares for the poor land. There is also a mill with one wheel and a pond under the station, from which the forester takes a lease of 1/40 litas.

In the manor there were over 200 hectares of land and an undescribed manor, next to which a water mill was located on the Łoknica River. The manor in Lady over time took on special significance, becoming the seat of the Bielsk forestry. Its task was to protect the remains of the Bielsk Forest. As this forest, apart from small remnants, practically ceased to exist, so with time the forestry was abolished as well. The time of the establishment of the manor house in Lady is difficult to determine, though it is assumed that it had its beginnings in the 16th century, when as part of the volost survey, Queen Bona established the Bielsk forestry, and the village of Ladka became the seat of the forester. In the 1740s, renovation works were carried out at the manor house in Lady, supervised by Jan Sekowski. In the place where the manor buildings were located until the present day, numerous fragments of bricks have been found.

In a church document from 1775 it was recorded that Lady there were 66 people in 13 houses.

In 1942 an Orthodox wooden chapel of the Holy Brothers Maccabees was built on the initiative of Teodor Pawluczuk in the north-eastern part of the village on the border with the village of Kuraszewo. The chapel belongs to the parish in Kuraszewo. Near the building there is a spring surrounded by sacrificial crosses.
