= Hrabniak =

- Settlement
- Location within Poland
- Coordinates: 52°47′45″N 23°25′15″E
- Country: Poland
- Voivodeship: Podlaskie
- County: Hajnówka
- Gmina: Czyże

Hrabniak [ˈxrabɲak] is a settlement in the administrative district of Gmina Czyże, within Hajnówka County, Podlaskie Voivodeship, in north-eastern Poland.
