= Wieżanka =

- Village
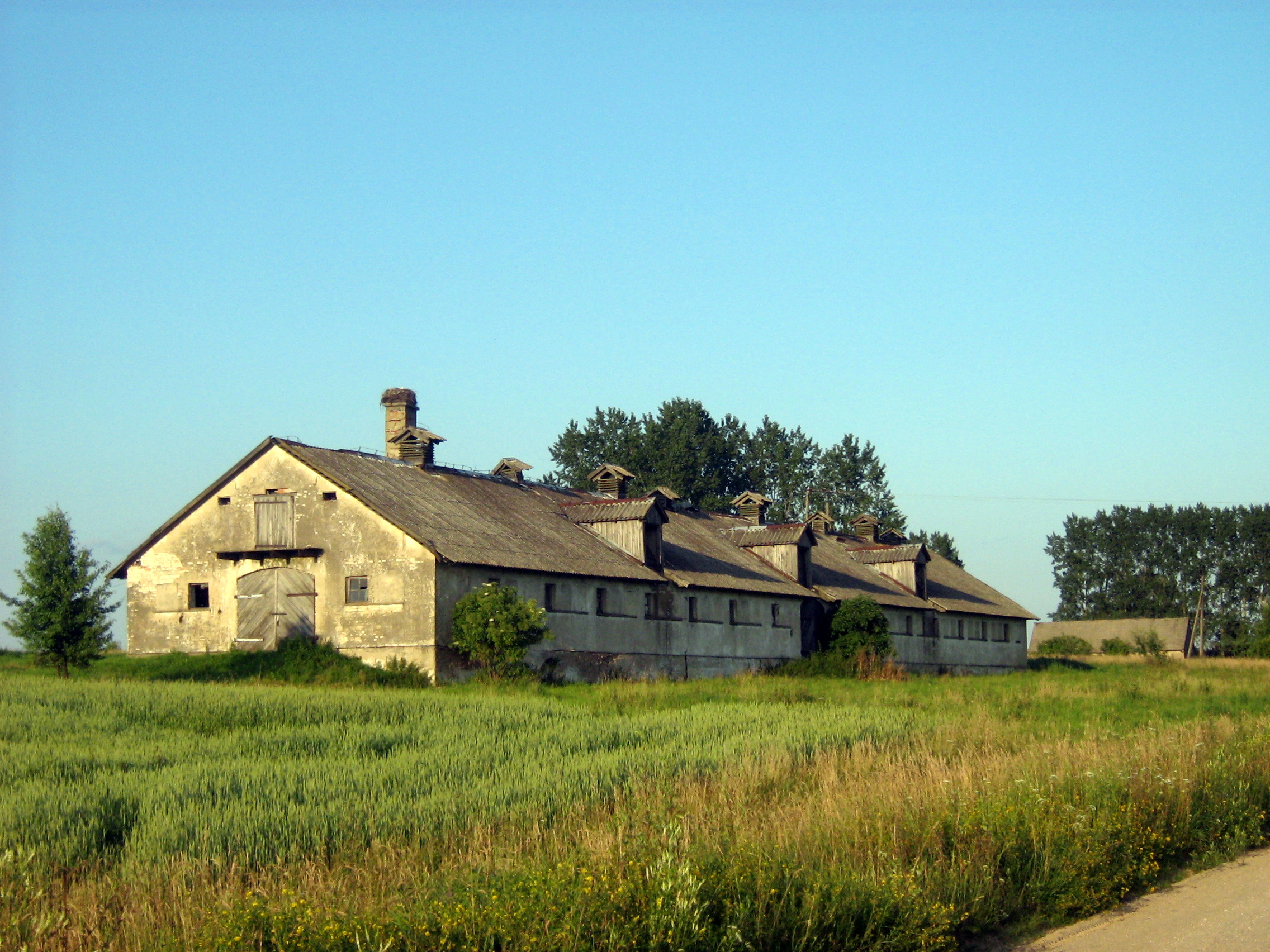
- Former state farm in Wieżanka

- Location within Poland
- Coordinates: 52°46′30″N 23°29′30″E
- Country: Poland
- Voivodeship: Podlaskie
- County: Hajnówka
- Gmina: Czyże

Wieżanka [vʲɛˈʐaŋka] is a village in the administrative district of Gmina Czyże, within Hajnówka County, Podlaskie Voivodeship, in north-eastern Poland.
