= Podrzeczany =

- Village
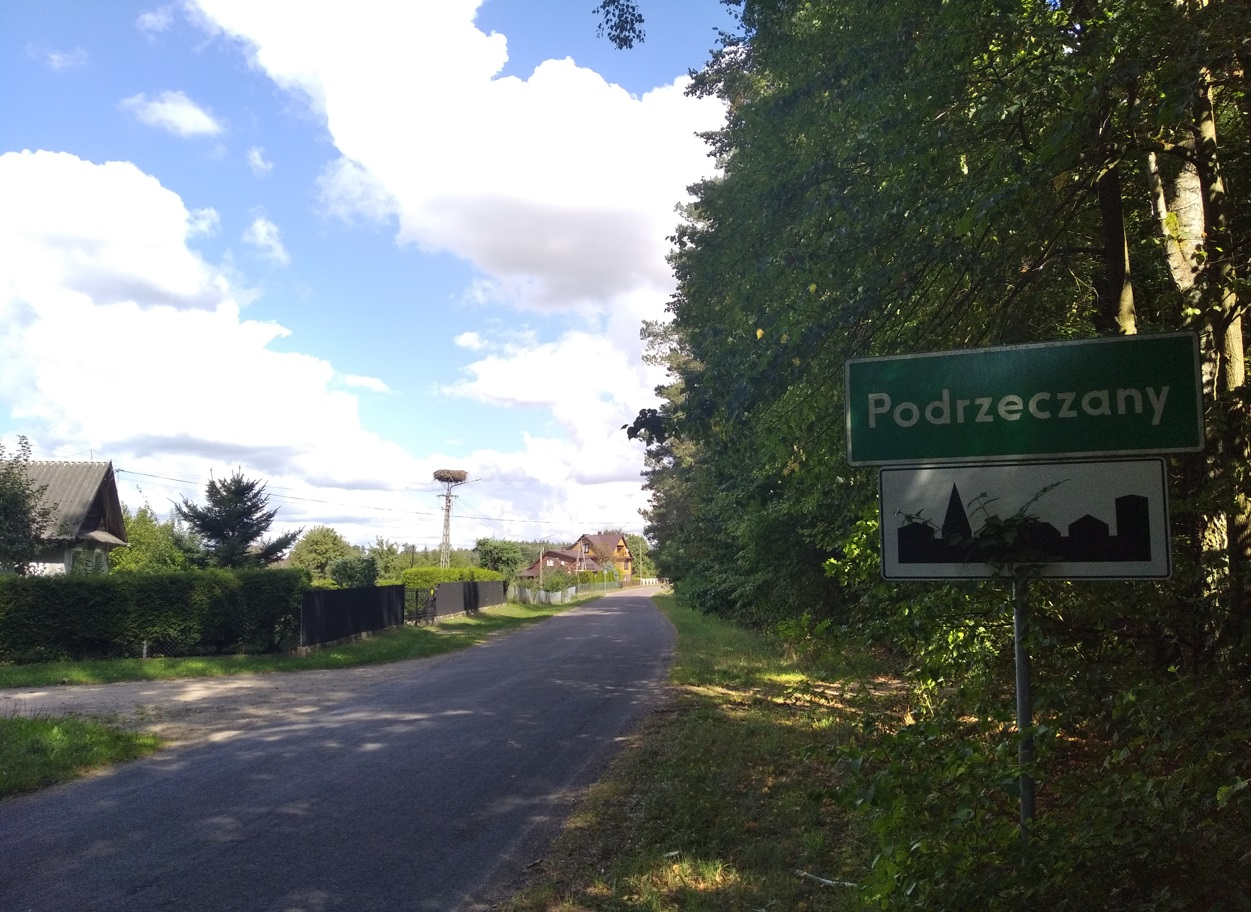

- Location within Poland
- Coordinates: 52°47′N 23°23′E
- Country: Poland
- Voivodeship: Podlaskie
- County: Hajnówka
- Gmina: Czyże

Podrzeczany [pɔdʐɛˈt͡ʂanɨ] is a village in the administrative district of Gmina Czyże, within Hajnówka County, Podlaskie Voivodeship, in north-eastern Poland.

== History ==
In the illustration of the Podlaskie voivodeship from 1576, the present-day village of Podrzecze was called Podrzecze or Loknicza. It is possible that in distant times Podrzecze was connected with the nearby Łoknica, so perhaps they were treated as one village. The main difference between the villages mentioned was that Łoknica was a private manor village, belonging to the Loknicki family, while Podrzeczany was a royal village. In a church document from 1775, it was recorded that 52 people living in 10 houses were registered in the village.
