= Leszczyny, Podlaskie Voivodeship =

Leszczyny
- Village
- Location within Poland
- Coordinates: 52°48′58″N 23°25′02″E
- Country: Poland
- Voivodeship: Podlaskie
- County: Hajnówka
- Gmina: Czyże

Leszczyny [lɛʂˈt͡ʂɨnɨ] is a village in the administrative district of Gmina Czyże, within Hajnówka County, Podlaskie Voivodeship, in north-eastern Poland.
