= Leniewo =

- Village
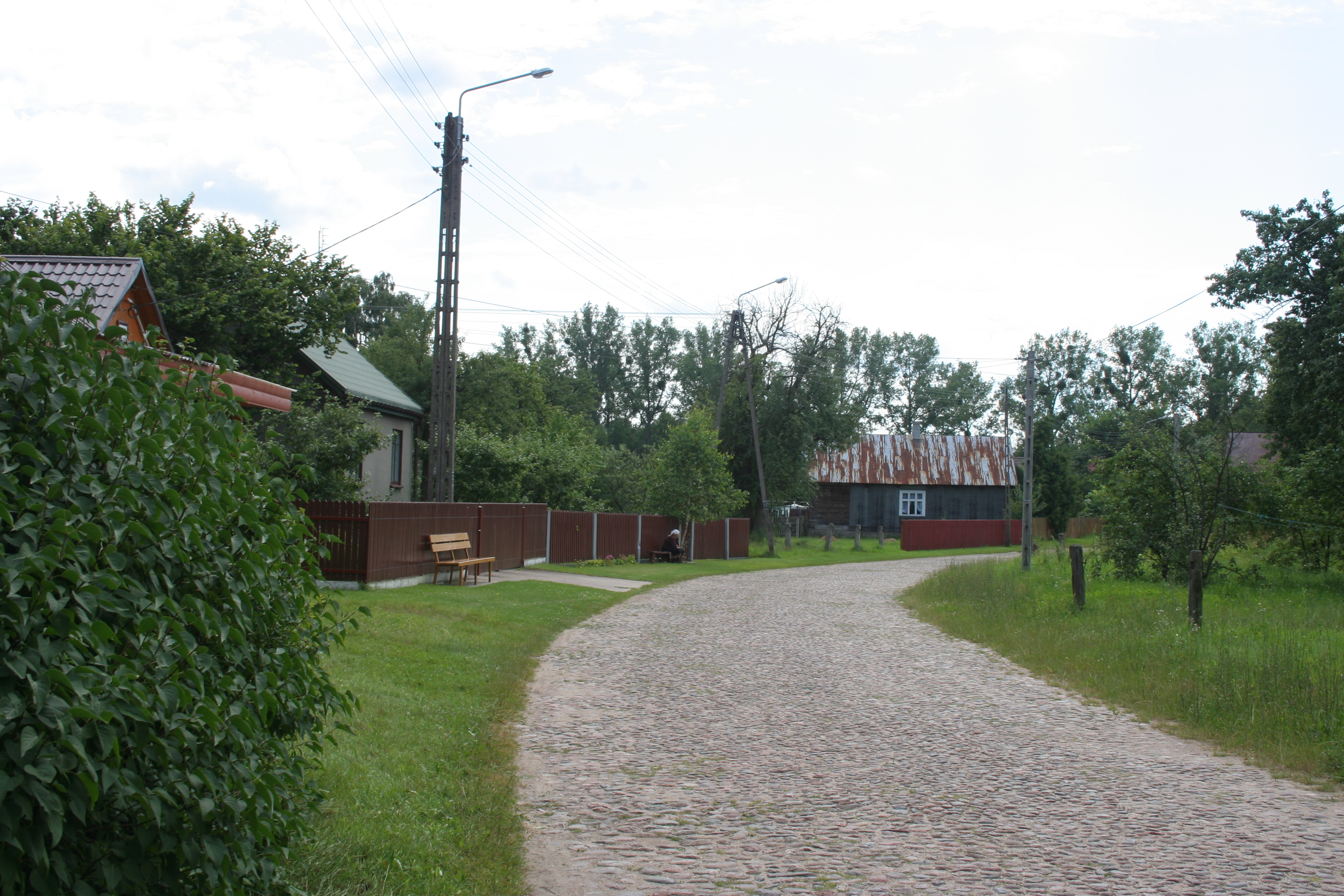

- Location within Poland
- Coordinates: 52°48′N 23°25′E
- Country: Poland
- Voivodeship: Podlaskie
- County: Hajnówka
- Gmina: Czyże
- Population: 83

Leniewo [lɛˈɲɛvɔ] is a village in the administrative district of Gmina Czyże, within Hajnówka County, Podlaskie Voivodeship, in north-eastern Poland.

== History ==
The village was founded around 1540 on the farm of Żuk Leniewicz, who was the first to settle in the area.

Since at least the 17th century, there have been manor buildings in the village, belonging at the end of the century to the sword-bearer Wacław na Jeruzalach Jaruzelski of the Ślepowron coat of arms, and at the end of the 18th century to Wojciech Szepietowski of the Ślepowron coat of arms. After 1800, a brick chapel with a roof made of tiles was built near the manor. This place was referred to as Leniewo Sady.

In a church document from 1775 it was recorded that Leniewo had 109 people living in 28 houses. According to the 1921 census, the village was inhabited by 157 people, among whom 2 were Roman Catholic, 149 Orthodox, and 6 Mosaic. At the same time, 11 inhabitants declared Polish nationality, 146 Belarusian. There were 36 residential buildings in the village.
