= Kamień, Hajnówka County =

Kamień
- Village
- Location within Poland
- Coordinates: 52°50′N 23°30′E
- Country: Poland
- Voivodeship: Podlaskie
- County: Hajnówka
- Gmina: Czyże

Kamień (Polish pronunciation: [ˈkamjɛj̃]) is a village in the administrative district of Gmina Czyże, within Hajnówka County, Podlaskie Voivodeship, in north-eastern Poland.
