= Łuszcze =

- Village
- Location within Poland
- Coordinates: 52°48′N 23°27′E
- Country: Poland
- Voivodeship: Podlaskie
- County: Hajnówka
- Gmina: Czyże

Łuszcze [ˈwuʂt͡ʂɛ] is a village in the administrative district of Gmina Czyże, within Hajnówka County, Podlaskie Voivodeship, in north-eastern Poland.
