= Zbucz =

- Village
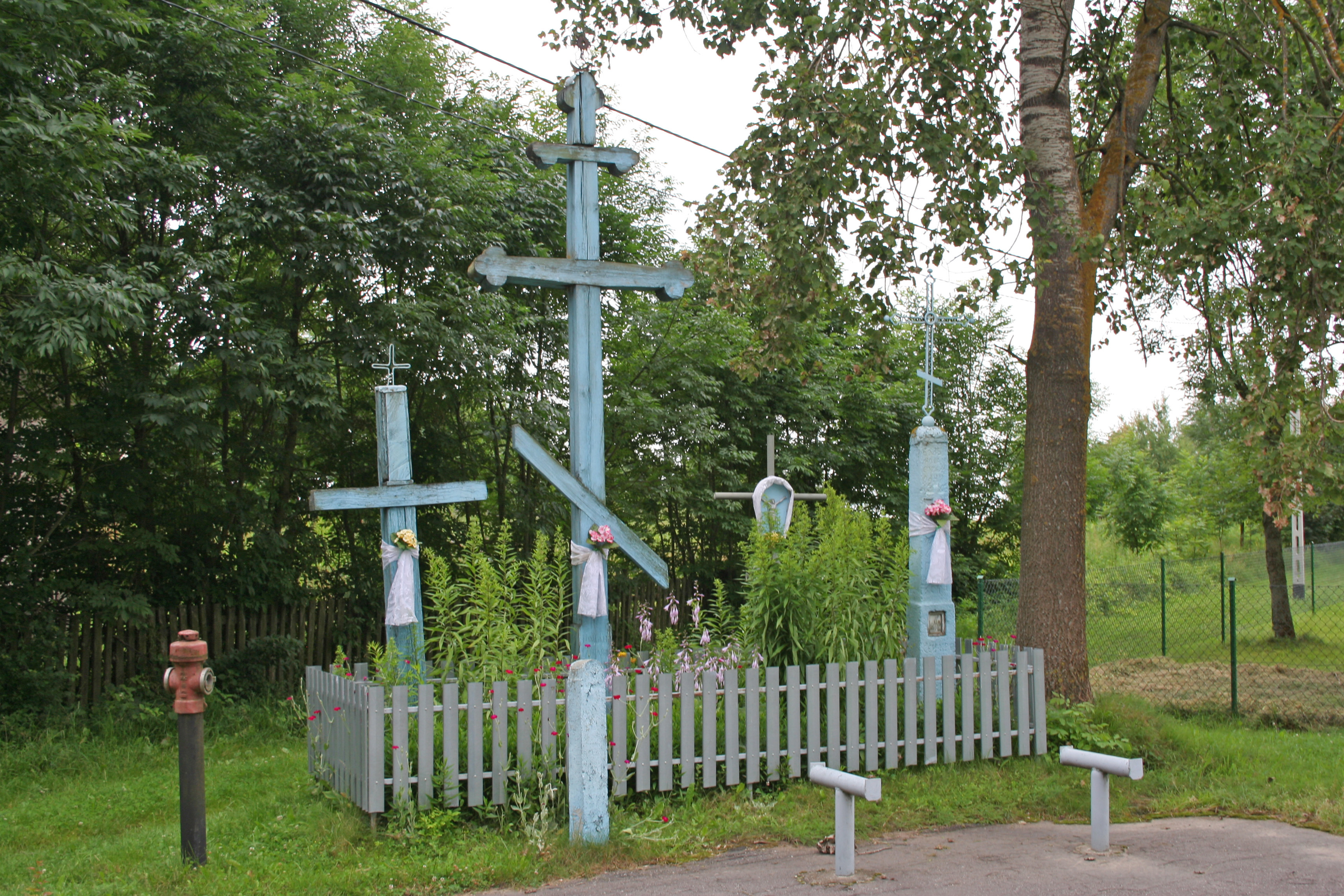
- Orthodox crosses in Zbucz

- Location within Poland
- Coordinates: 52°45′N 23°26′E
- Country: Poland
- Voivodeship: Podlaskie
- County: Hajnówka
- Gmina: Czyże

Zbucz [zbut͡ʂ] is a village in the administrative district of Gmina Czyże, within Hajnówka County, Podlaskie Voivodeship, in north-eastern Poland.
