= Szostakowo =

- Village
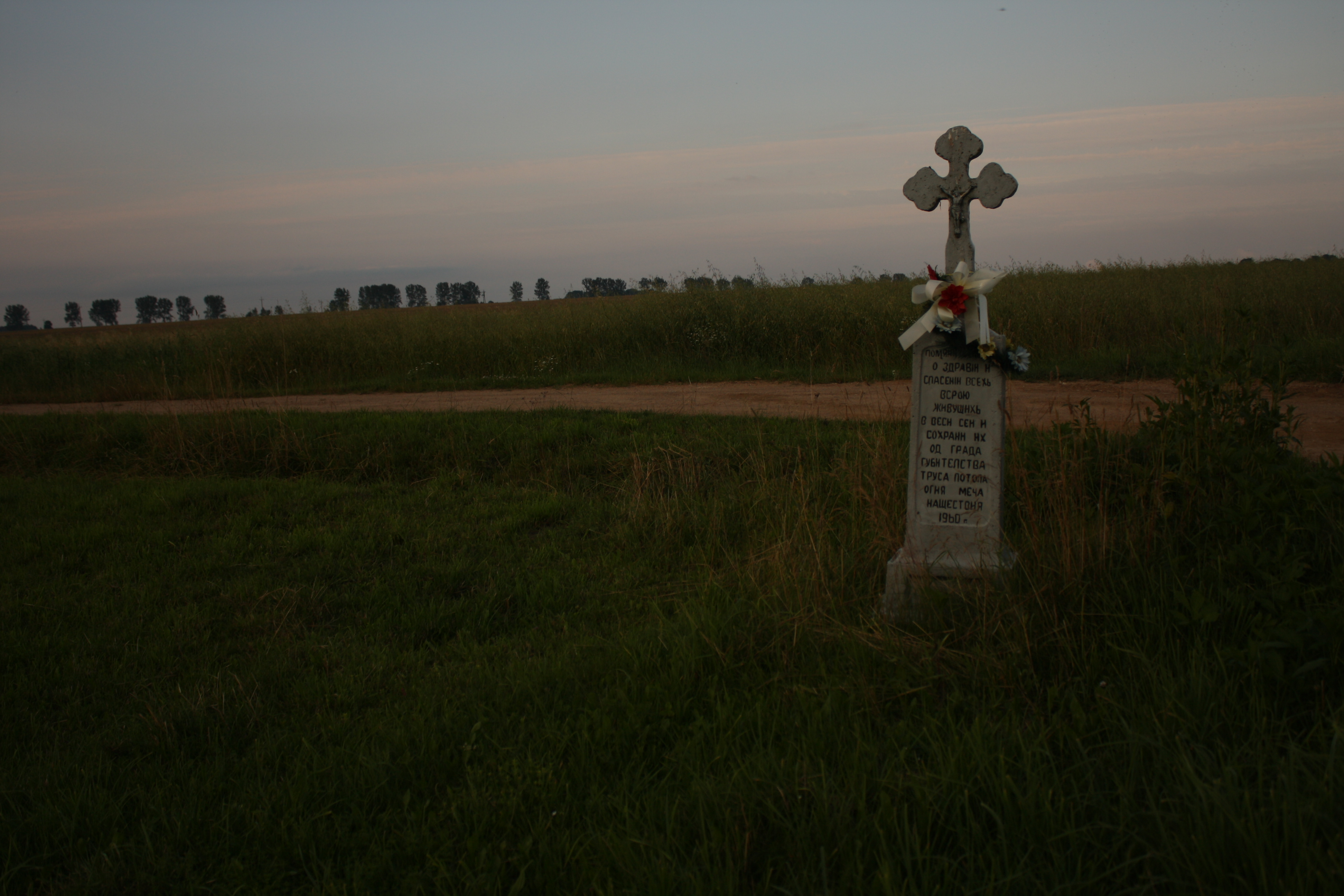

- Location within Poland
- Coordinates: 52°46′N 23°29′E
- Country: Poland
- Voivodeship: Podlaskie
- County: Hajnówka
- Gmina: Czyże

Szostakowo [ʂɔstaˈkɔvɔ] is a village in the administrative district of Gmina Czyże, within Hajnówka County, Podlaskie Voivodeship, in north-eastern Poland.
