= Bujakowszczyzna =

- Settlement
- Location within Poland
- Coordinates: 52°47′30″N 23°25′30″E
- Country: Poland
- Voivodeship: Podlaskie
- County: Hajnówka
- Gmina: Czyże

Bujakowszczyzna [bujakɔfʂˈt͡ʂɨzna] is a settlement in the administrative district of Gmina Czyże, within Hajnówka County, Podlaskie Voivodeship, in north-eastern Poland.
