= Morze, Hajnówka County =

Morze
- Village
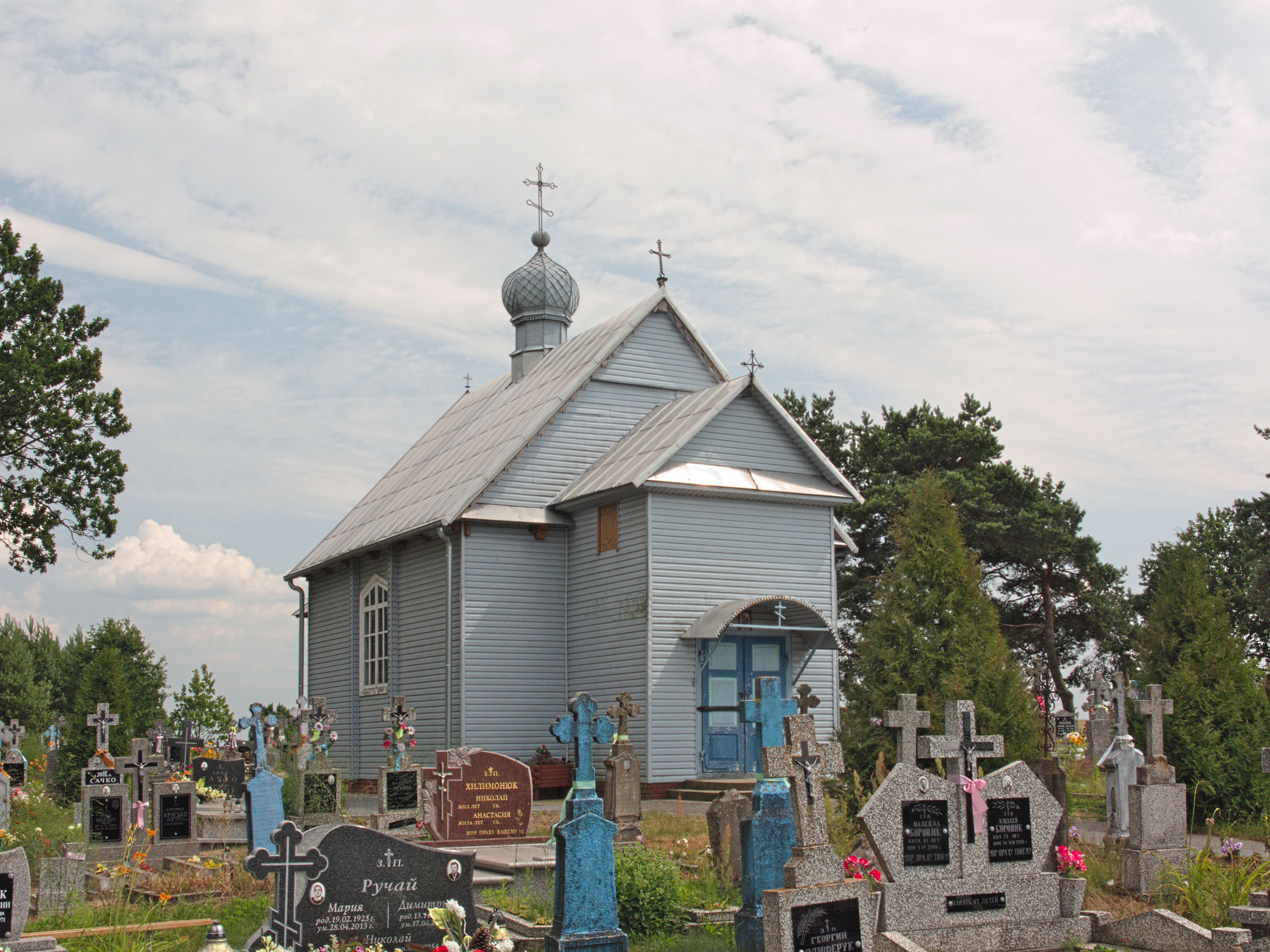

- Location within Poland
- Coordinates: 52°43′N 23°24′E
- Country: Poland
- Voivodeship: Podlaskie
- County: Hajnówka
- Gmina: Czyże

Morze [ˈmɔʐɛ] (Belarusian: Мора, More) is a village in the administrative district of Gmina Czyże, within Hajnówka County, Podlaskie Voivodeship, in north-eastern Poland.

== Born ==
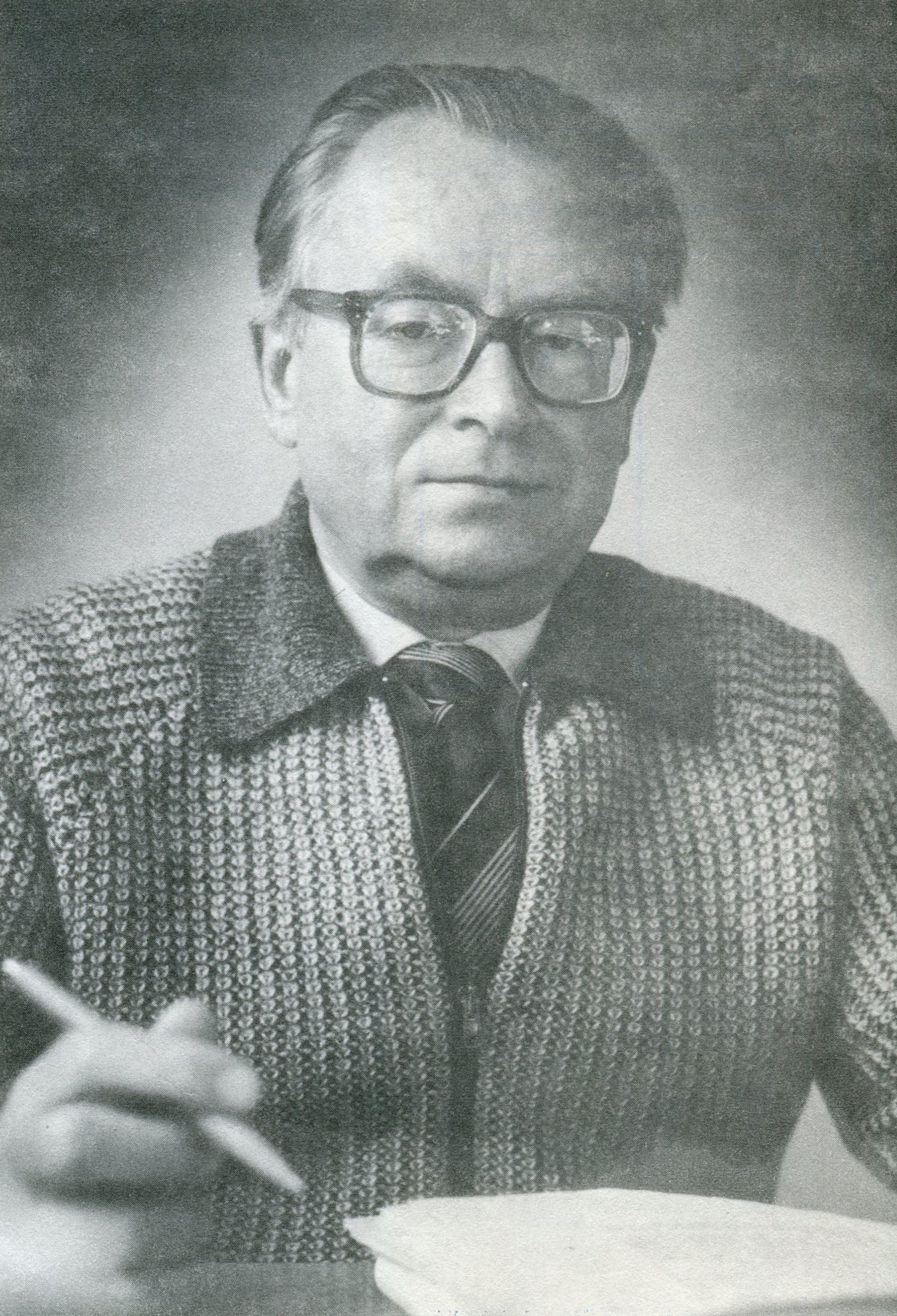
Viktar Svied.

- Viktar Svied — Belarusian poet (1925—2020).
