= Gmina Czyże =

Gmina Czyże Czyże Commune
- Gmina
- Coat of arms
- Interactive map of Gmina Czyże
- Coordinates (Czyże): 52°47′N 23°25′E
- Country: Poland
- Voivodeship: Podlaskie
- County: Hajnówka
- Seat: Czyże

Government
  - Mayor: Jerzy Wasiluk

Area
  - Total: 134.2 km^{2} (51.8 sq mi)

Population (2006)
  - Total: 2,528
  - Density: 18.84/km^{2} (48.79/sq mi)
- Website: https://www.ugczyze.pl/

Gmina Czyże (Belarusian: Гміна Чыжы) is a rural gmina (administrative district) in Hajnówka County, Podlaskie Voivodeship, in north-eastern Poland. Its seat is the village of Czyże, which lies approximately 12 kilometres (7 mi) north-west of Hajnówka and 41 km (25 mi) south-east of the regional capital Białystok.

The gmina covers an area of 134.2 square kilometres (51.8 sq mi), and as of 2006 its total population is 2,528.

It is one of five Polish/Belarusian bilingual Gmina in Podlaskie Voivodeship regulated by the Act of 6 January 2005 on National and Ethnic Minorities and on the Regional Languages, which permits certain gminas with significant linguistic minorities to introduce a second, auxiliary language to be used in official contexts alongside Polish.

== Villages ==
Gmina Czyże contains the villages and settlements of Bujakowszczyzna, Czyże, Hrabniak, Hukowicze, Kamień, Klejniki, Kojły, Kuraszewo, Lady, Leniewo, Leszczyny, Łuszcze, Maksymowszczyzna, Morze, Osówka, Podrzeczany, Podwieżanka, Rakowicze, Sapowo, Szostakowo, Wieżanka, Wólka and Zbucz.

== Neighbouring gminas ==
Gmina Czyże is bordered by the gminas of Bielsk Podlaski, Dubicze Cerkiewne, Hajnówka, Narew and Orla.
