= Kuraszewo, Gmina Czyże =

Kuraszewo
- Village
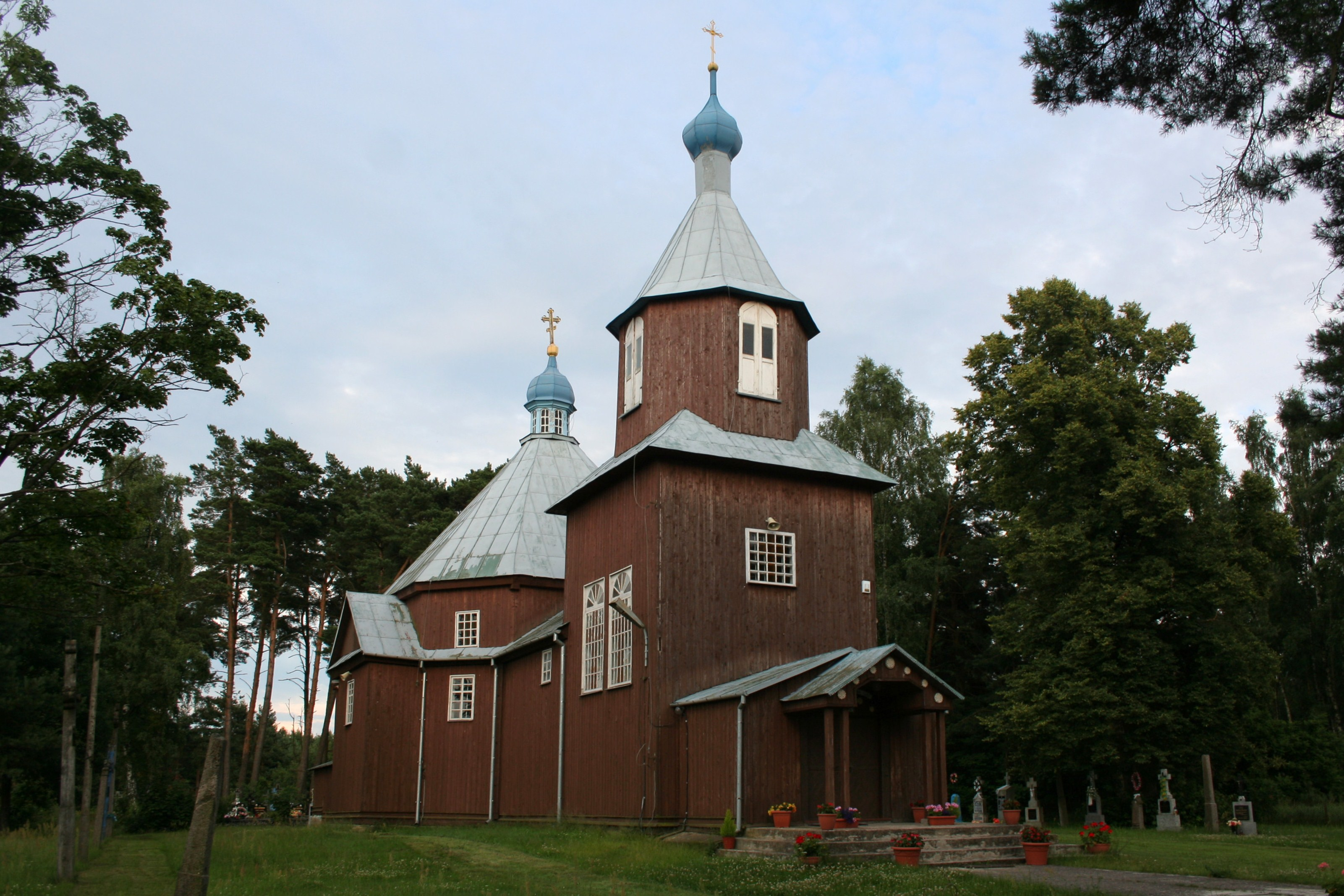
- Church of St. Antoni

- Location within Poland
- Coordinates: 52°35′15″N 23°25′48″E
- Country: Poland
- Voivodeship: Podlaskie
- County: Hajnówka
- Gmina: Czyże

Kuraszewo [kuraˈʂɛvɔ] is a village in the administrative district of Gmina Czyże, within Hajnówka County, Podlaskie Voivodeship, in north-eastern Poland.
