= Hajnówka =

Hajnówka Гайнаўка
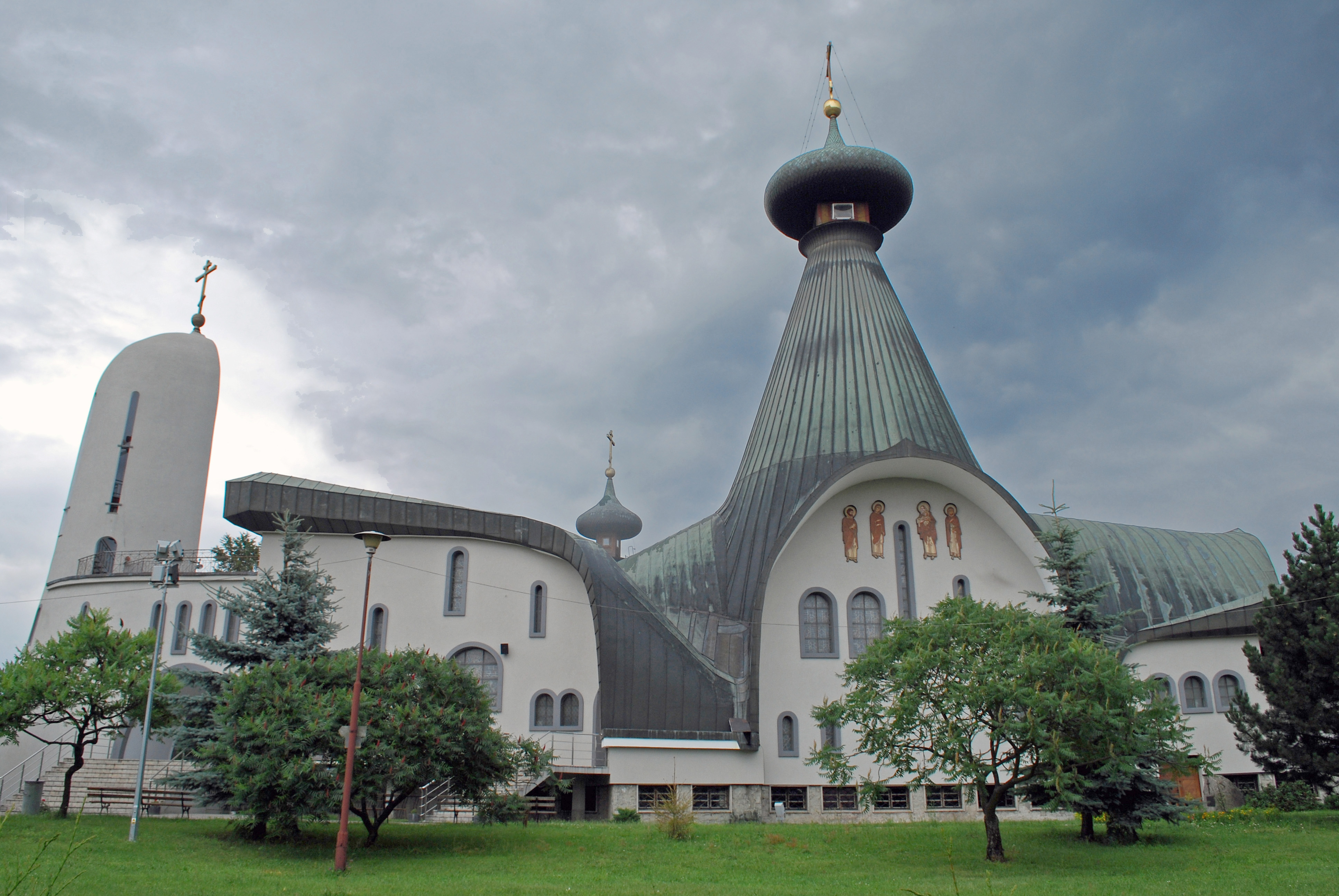
- Orthodox Holy Trinity's Church (1981)

- Coat of arms
- Interactive map of Hajnówka
- Location within Poland
- Coordinates: 52°44′N 23°34′E
- Country: Poland
- Voivodeship: Podlaskie
- County: Hajnówka
- Gmina: Hajnówka (urban gmina)
- Established: 17th century
- Town rights: 1951

Government
  - Mayor: Ireneusz Kiendyś

Area
  - City: 21.29 km^{2} (8.22 sq mi)

Population (2018)
  - City: 20,914
  - Density: 982.3/km^{2} (2,544/sq mi)
  - Metro: 22,594
- Time zone: UTC+1 (CET)
  - Summer (DST): UTC+2 (CEST)
- Postal code: 17-200
- Area code: +48 85
- Car plates: BHA
- Website: www.hajnowka.pl

Hajnówka (Note: Polish pronunciation: [xajˈnufka] khy-NOOF-kə; Belarusian: Гайнаўка, romanized: Hajnaŭka; Podlachian: Hájnuvka; Yiddish: הײַנאָװקאַ, romanized: Haynovka) is a town and a powiat seat in the Podlaskie Voivodeship in eastern Poland, with a population of 21,442 inhabitants as of 2014. It is the capital of Hajnówka County. The town is also notable for its proximity to the Białowieża Forest, the biggest primaeval forest in Europe. Through Hajnówka flows the river Leśna Prawa. It is one of the centres of Orthodox faith and a notable centre of Belarusian culture in Poland. Belarusians constituted 26.4% of the town's population in 2002.

It is one of five Polish/Belarusian bilingual gminas in Podlaskie Voivodeship regulated by the Act of 6 January 2005 on National and Ethnic Minorities and on the Regional Languages, which permits certain gminas with significant linguistic minorities to introduce a second, auxiliary language to be used in official contexts alongside Polish.

== History ==
For a more detailed history of Białowieża and the area see: Białowieża Forest

In 1589, the constitution "Ordinato o prowentach królch" divided the royal estates into state and table estates. The Białowieża Forest became part of the table estates, designated for the maintenance of the royal court, and was therefore particularly protected. A settlement was established in these areas by the Hajnówka Guard, Haynym Heyno, who was granted the Skarbosławka forest in the 18th century by King Augustus II of Saxony (after the river of the same name, a left tributary of the Leśna River). Today, it is a road dividing the Dubiny lands from the lands of the villages of Postołowo, Sawiny Gród, and Lipiny. This ranger's name soon changed to Hajnowski Bór, and then to Hajnowszczyzna. Hajnowszczyzna gained greater importance during the reign of Antoni Tyzenhauz, when around 1775 the Białowieża Forest was divided into 13 guards, with the headquarters of one of them (the Hajnówka guard) located within the present-day city. However, the forest protection (it was most probably the first forest reserve in the world) prevented the area from economical growth and so the village was limited to a number of wooden huts at the western end of the forest. It mostly shared the history of other similar settlements in the area, including Białowieża itself.

After the Third Partition of Poland the area was annexed by Kingdom of Prussia and Russian Empire in 1795 (the border of the partitioning powers, Prussian and Russian, ran on the territory of today's town). In 1807, the Duchy of Warsaw was created, but Hajnówka and its surrounding territories (Belostok Oblast) was handed over in full to the Russian Empire. After the fall of the Duchy of Warsaw in 1815, Hajnówka remained in the hands of Tsarist Russia. The Russian authorities abolished the forest protection, but the development of the area did not start. As most of the foresters, who worked in the forest, took part in the November Uprising of 1831 against Russia (500 out of 502 in total), their positions were abolished and the people were exiled to Siberia. The protection of the forest was affected. The village, as a matter of fact, ceased its existence. Protection was reintroduced in 1860 and the village was repopulated with Russian officials. In 1888 it became property of the tsarist family.

The village of Hajnówka, along with the Kozi Przeskok forest range (Polish: Uroczysko), belonged to the Dubiny State Estate at the time. The 1878 plan of Belovezhsky-Alexandrovski Volost, Pruzhansky Uyezd, Grodno Governorate, clearly shows the current streets of Hajnówka: Stefana Batorego, Lipowa Street, which intersects it and merges with today's Krzywa Street, Wincentego Kolodzieja, and Warszawska Street, leading south towards Kleszczele. From the east, it led to the village of Lipiny. The housing estates along these streets, as well as Kozi Przeskok and Mazury, are the oldest districts of the city. At that time, however, there was no present-day 3 Maja Street or direct road to Bielsk Podlaski. There was also no railway line. The road connection between Hajnówka and Bielsk ran through Dolne, Nowe Berezowo, Dubicze Osoczne and Orli. The property of the Hajnówka Forest Guard was located on present-day Bartorego Street. The city's spatial layout was determined and developed by the industrial plants that established their presence, primarily during the German occupation during World War I. Between 1894 and 1906 the village was connected with the world by a railroad linking Bielsk Podlaski and Siedlce with Wołkowysk. Hajnówka became a minor transport junction and in 1900 a road was built between Białowieża and Bielsk Podlaski.

=== World War I ===
During World War I, in 1915, the area was captured by the German Empire. Protection of the forest was ceased. The new authorities started large-scale industrial exploitation of the area's nature resources. Because of its nodal position, Hajnówka became a seat of two lumber-mills, wood spirit distillery and a major train station for 90 km (56 mi) of narrow gauge railways were built across the forest. The actual center of the Hajnówka settlement was located on Targowa Street (modern Wierobieja Street). After the Germans built a cinema and a Military officers' club on what is now 3 Maja Street between 1915 and 1919, the town center moved to this street. The Germans also established Turpentine Works "Terebenthen" which was owned before the war by Porowski brothers and Paweł Godlewski.

=== Interwar period and World War II ===
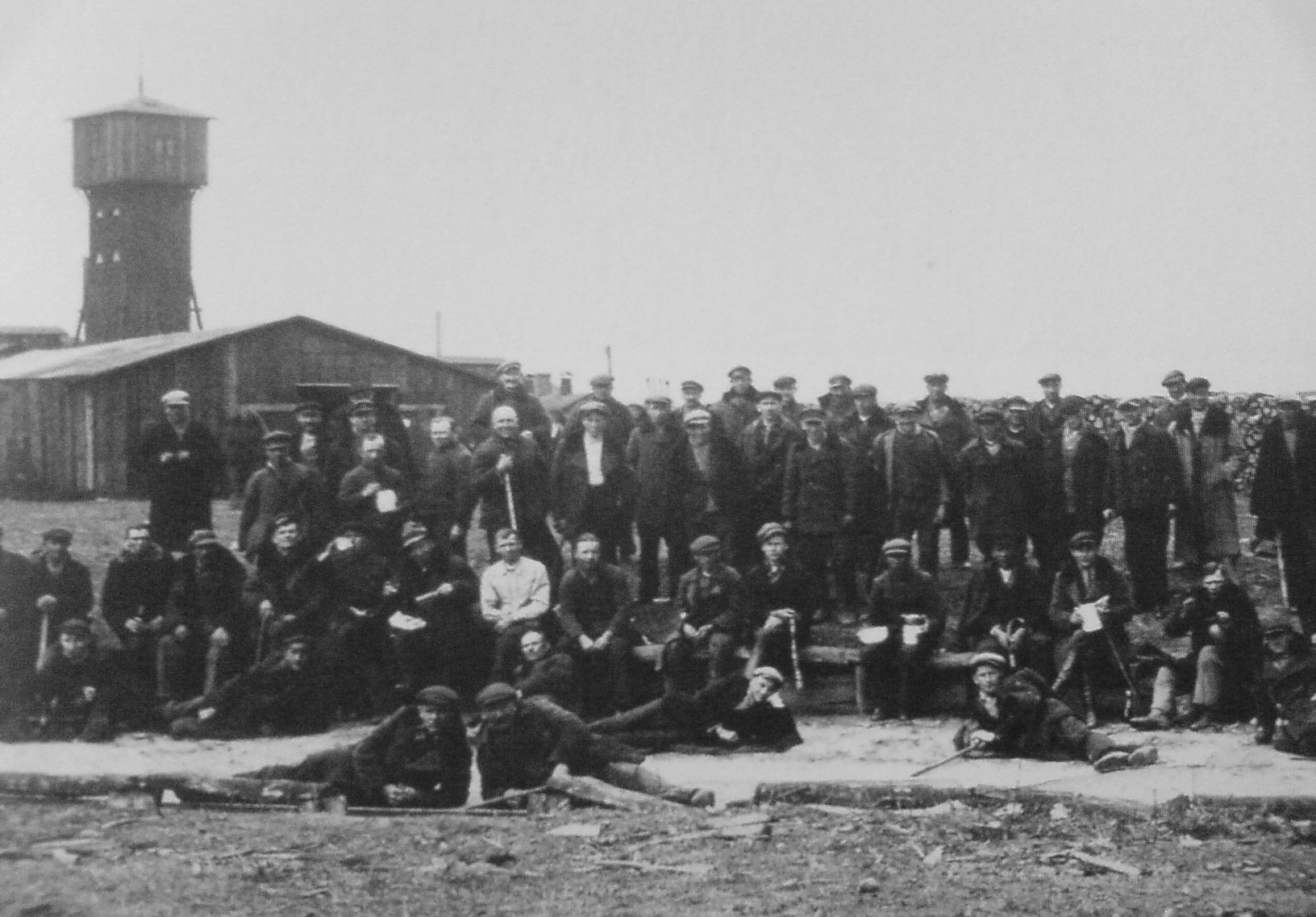
Workers striking at the Chemical factory

After regaining independence and the formation of the Second Polish Republic, Hajnówka began to develop, becoming a district town and a significant center of the timber industry on a European scale.

The Hajnówka Forest Railway Plant (Polish: Zakład Kolejowy Lasu Hajnówka) was a company that exploited forests in and around Hajnówka. It operates as part of Przedsiębiorstwo Produkcyjno-Usługowe "Las" sp. z o.o. in Hajnówka, which specializes in forest management and timber harvesting. This area was surrounded by forest on the north, east, and south sides, and on the west it bordered the ZDLP (State Forest Timber Plants Bathing Area).

In 1919, during the early stages of the Polish-Bolshevik War, the area was handed over to Poland by the local Ober-Ost commander. The predatory exploitation of the forest was put to an end and all German-built factories in the area became nationalised. After the war, some of them were rented by the Polish government under a contract to the British company The Century European Timber Corporation. However, in the late 1920s the contract was cancelled and the wood processing plants came back under state control, while the Terbenthen factory was sold to a private owner. Since then, the economic growth started and the village started to grow too. Hard work, but also decent salaries in wood processing plants attracted many settlers from various parts of Poland. The initial conglomerate of wooden huts, barracks, tents and narrow, wood-paved streets turned into a town.

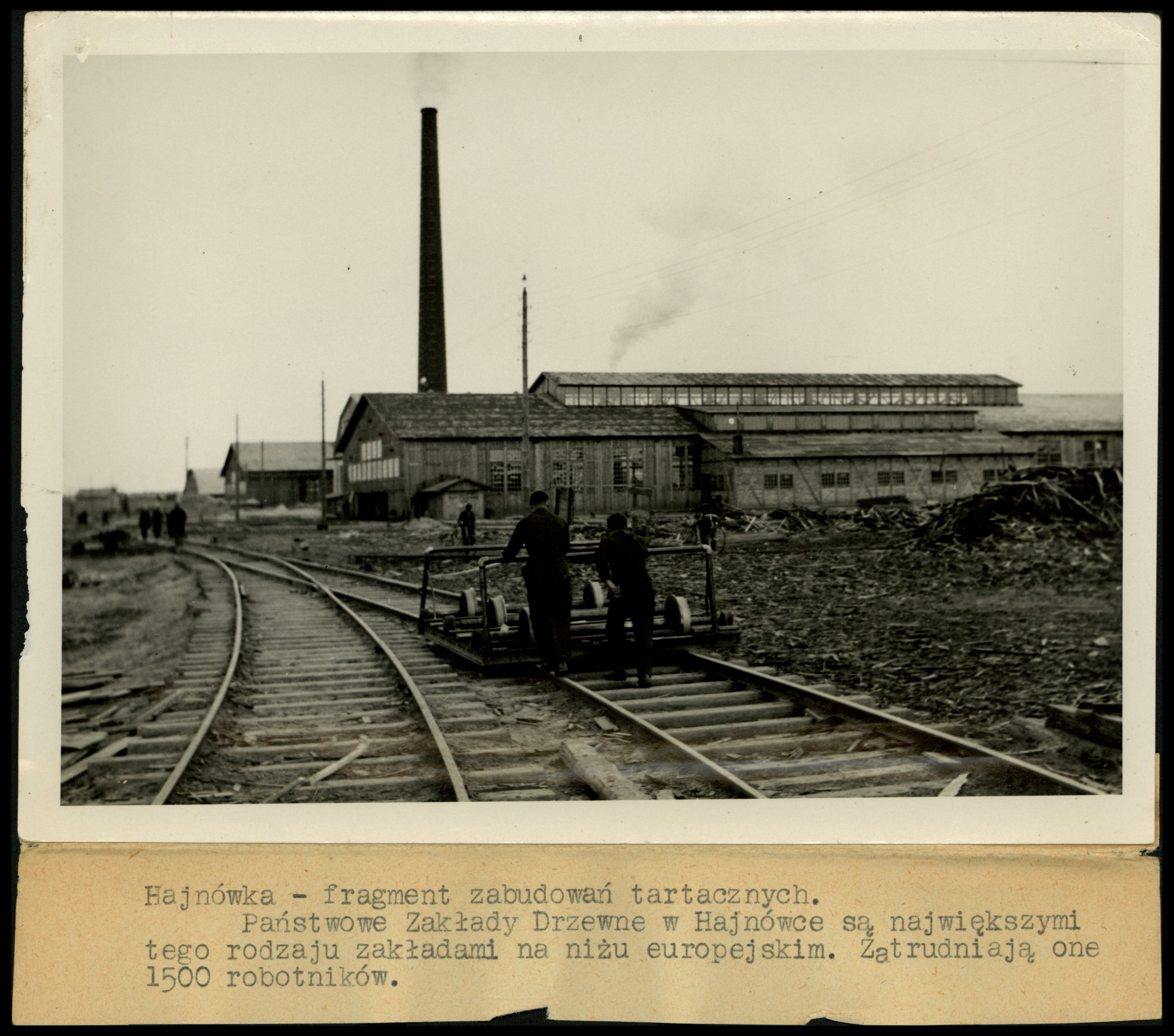
Polish State Timber Works in Hajnówka in the 1930s

A Catholic church was built for the local population and soon the factories and the state financed three schools, a boarding school of timber industry, a post office, two cinemas and a bank appeared here. Jewish inhabitants built a synagogue and in 1925 the Orthodox Christians organised a chapel dedicated to the Kazan Icon of the Mother of God in a private home. As of 1921, the population was 80.9% Polish and 13.8% Belarusian. Also, the soldiers of the Belarusian division of general Stanisław Bułak-Bałachowicz were interned there after the war and finally were allowed to settle in the area, which added Belarusians and Russians to the ethnic mixture.

In 1924, a fire broke out in the barracks at the sawmill, which led to the establishment of fire departments in industrial plants. In 1927, the Volunteer Fire Department was established. The State School of Timber Industry was established in 1924. By the end of the 1930s the four factories of Hajnówka had 1,947 workers altogether and were significantly expanded. The state financed construction of several hundred small houses for the workers and the town grew up rapidly. Czworaki district was constructed in that period for workers of the timber industry (later on some parts of the district the Mikołaja Reja District was constructed. Also, the town attracted many notable Polish architects of the epoch to build new buildings in modernist style.

=== World War II ===
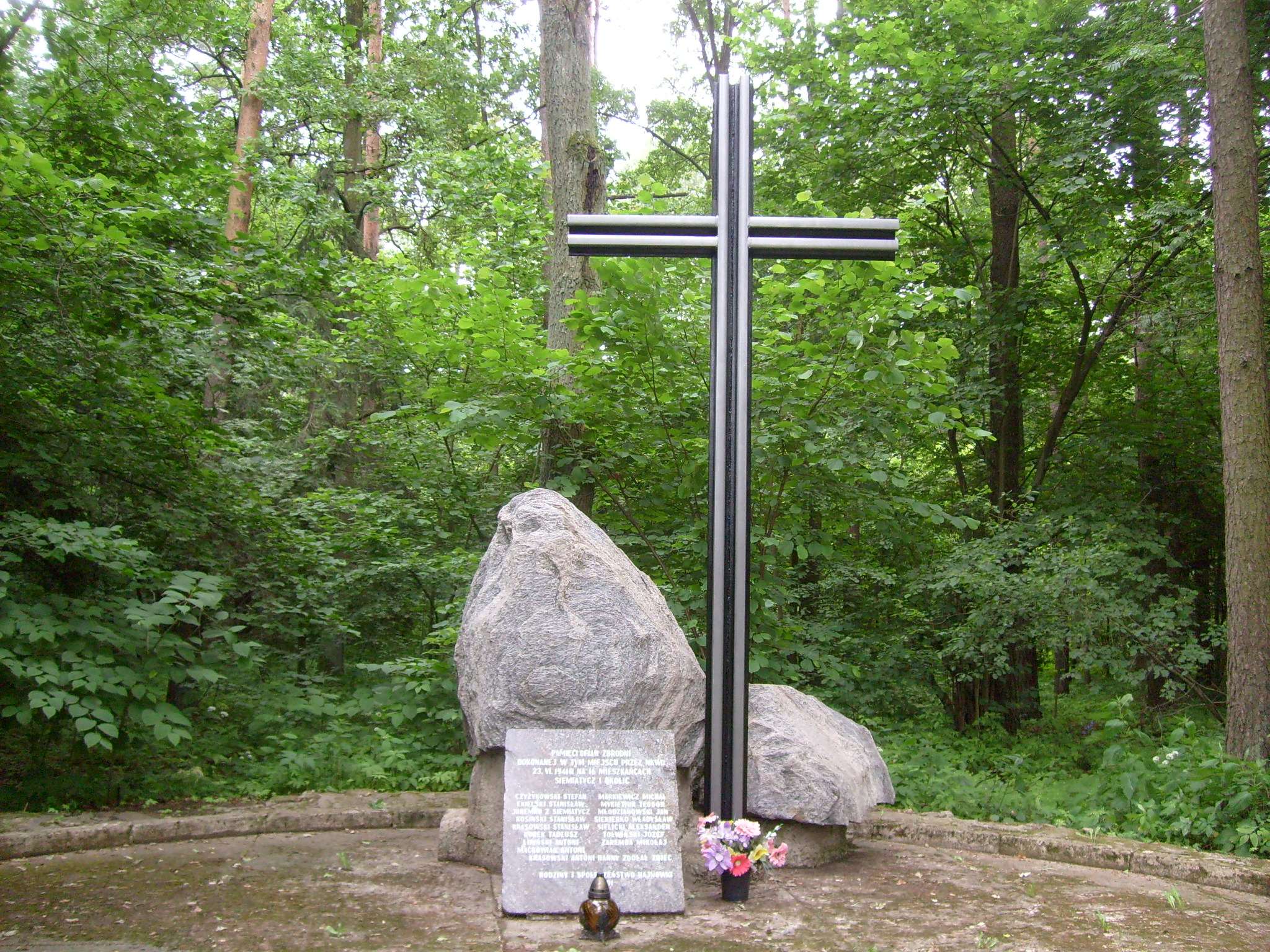
Memorial at the site of a Soviet-perpetrated massacre of Poles from 23 June 1941

Hajnówka was not located on the strategic line of German military operations. There was no significant concentration of troops in the area on either side. In the first half of September, only individual infantry and mounted soldiers, or small groups from dispersed units, encountered each other in Hajnówka. From approximately September 7th to 9th, a permanent machine gun position with a two-man crew existed on the roof of one of the industrial buildings of the Chemical Factory. A few days later, an anti-aircraft gun appeared in Hajnówka, positioned by the river, within the former Hajnówka Forest District. It stood in the bushes, roughly where the Orlen gas station now stands, in an area overgrown with bushes at the time.

The Germans entered Hajnówka on September 17th. In the afternoon of that critical day, an armoured unit approached Hajnówka from the direction of Bielsk Podlaski, in accordance with familiar German tactics. It consisted of light tanks with a two-man crew, armed with a machine gun and a cannon. These tanks moved along the road and entered Hajnówka on 3 Maja Street. Just ahead of them, the remnants of scattered Polish units retreated towards the Białowieża Forest. These units did not engage in open combat with the advancing Germans, but merely provided covering fire to ensure a safe withdrawal. The Polish unit was noticed by the Germans after Corporal Bolesław Bierwiaczonek destroyed one tank and held up a column of German soldiers at the entrance to the city. Meanwhile The Polish soldiers and their gun were moving along Lipowa Street on the route to the forest were spotted by another German tank traveling along 3 Maja Street from the direction of the railway viaduct but they managed to destroy it as well on the intersection with Lipowa street. Bierwiaczonek and other soldiers retreated along Lipowa Street toward the village of Lipiny. However, near Lipiny, they came under fire from both artillery and pursuing Germans, leaving Bierwiaczonek severely wounded. After retreating into the forest, he died and was buried in the village of Budy.

=== Soviet occupation ===
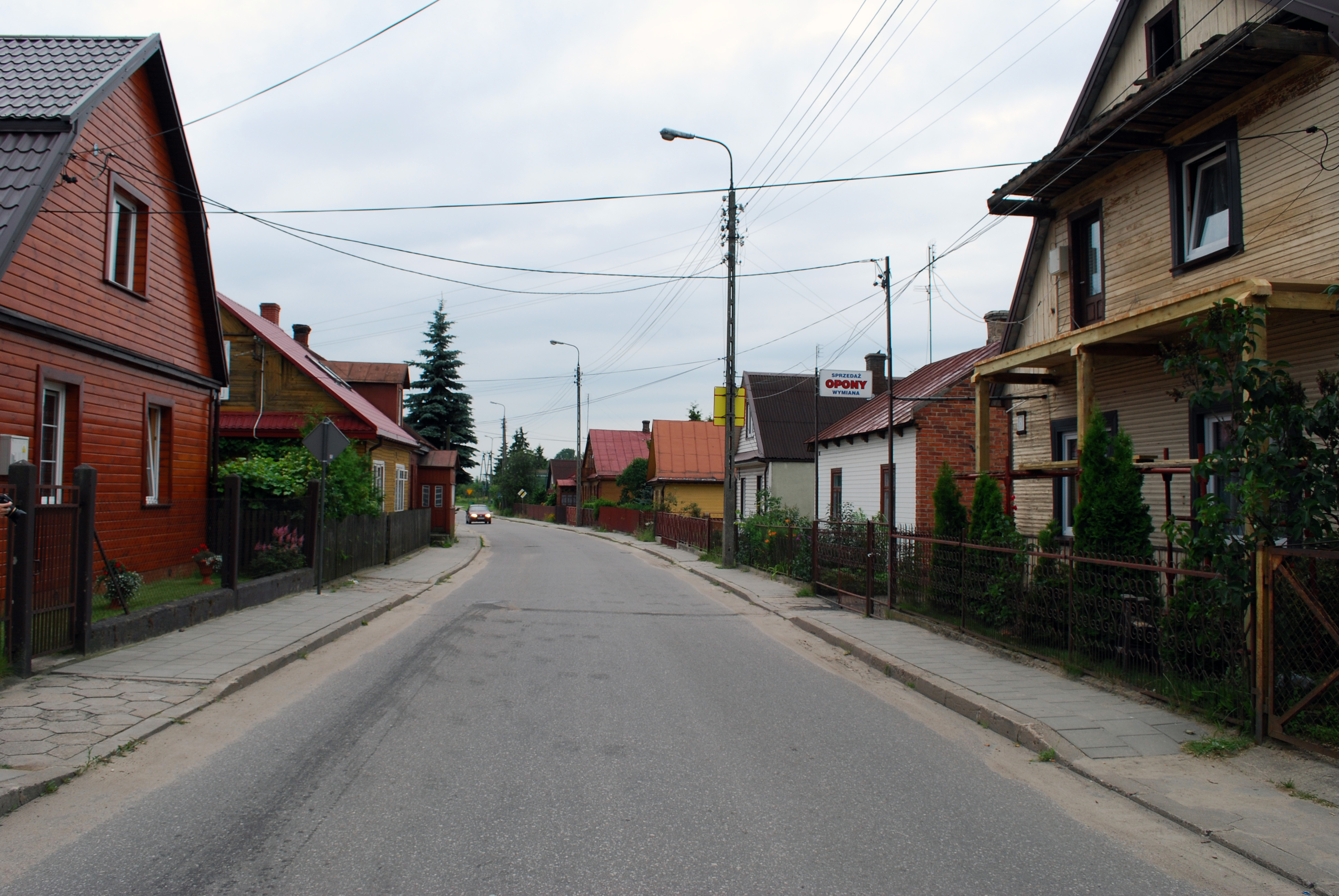
Warszawska street

Before noon of the same day, the first Red Army personnel appeared in Hajnówka. They were political officers, armed only with handguns. On the same day, the first meeting with Russian participation took place in Hajnówka, organized in Rezerwistów Square. The next day, regular Red Army units entered Hajnówka. A few days after the entrance of the Soviet occupation, a group of German soldiers arrived at Hajnowka with aim of exhuming and removal the bodies of German citizens buried here from the most distant periods, up to the present day, where their graves were the only ones known.

Soviet military units were deployed and stationed in Hajnówka in various locations: the former Hajnówka and Leśna Forest offices, the then-vacant square of the current Millenium District, the so-called Majdan, in front of the Warszawska railway crossing, on both sides of present-day Piłsudskiego Street, on the former Hajnówka Forest District and the adjacent, then-vacant square of the High School, and on the grounds of a military unit in the forest (today no. 2186) and in the village of Górne (incorporated to Hajnówka in 1952). There were no suitable facilities for military deployment there. Therefore, the soldiers were quartered in groups of 10-12 in the homes of private village residents. Military equipment and so-called economic resources were located in a field outside the village, where only makeshift wooden sheds had been constructed. Daily military classes and exercises were also held there.

During the Soviet occupation, the first hospital was opened. It initially operated in the now-defunct building of the former Primary School No. 3 on what is now Wróblewskiego Street.

=== German occupation ===
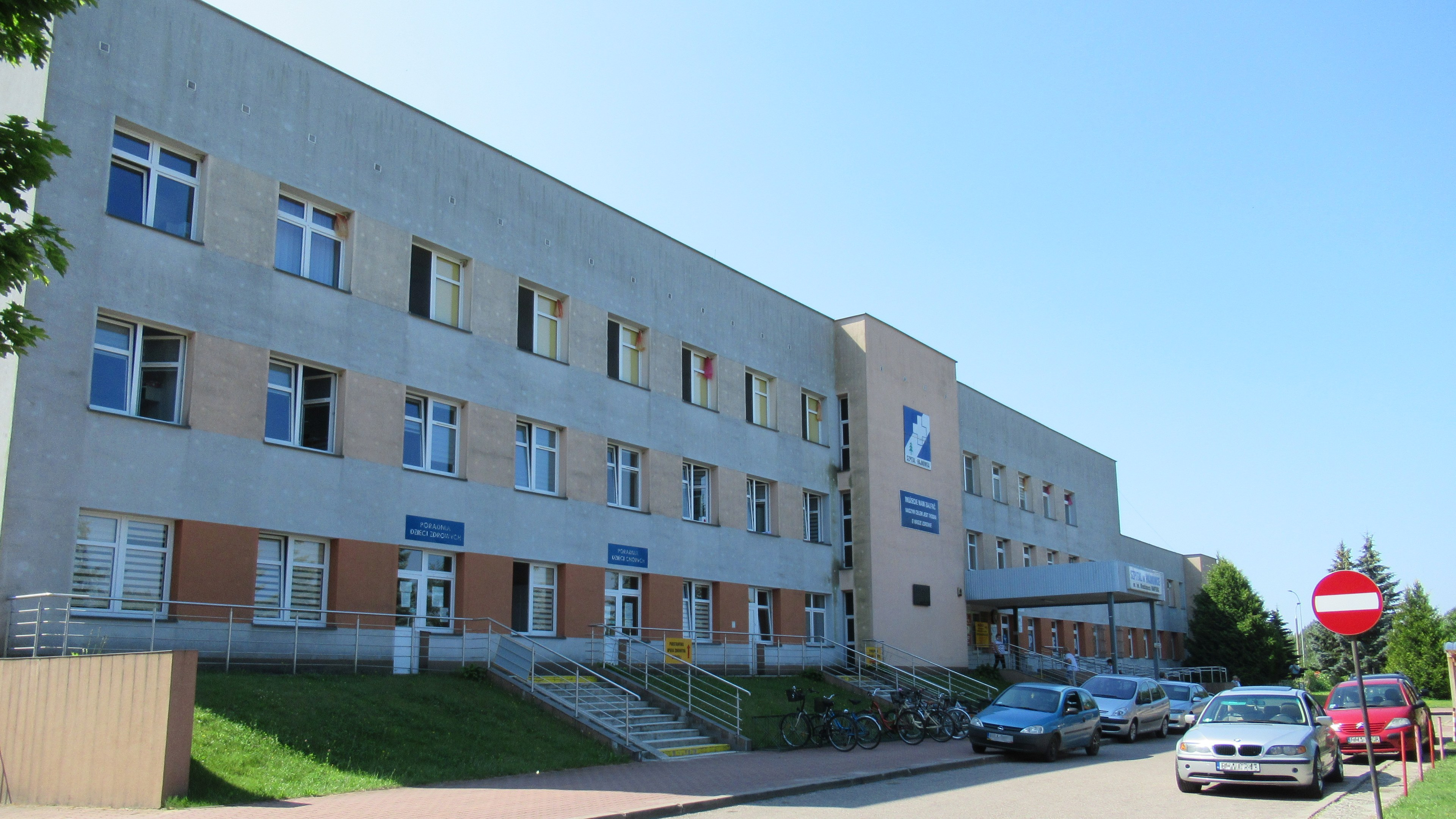
County hospital

Following Operation Barbarossa, at high noon on June 25th of June, the 508th Battalion of the 292nd Infantry Division and the 3rd Cyclist Company, supported by the 47th Armored Corps entered Hajnówka from the direction of Bielsk Podlaski. Shortly thereafter, it turned out that several Soviet soldiers were behind the German advance line, likely emerging from hiding. Realizing the hopelessness of their situation, they made a desperate attempt to break through Hajnówka into the Białowieża Forest. They had two truck with a heavy machine gun mounted on its bed. Driving the entire length of 3 Maja Street—the approximately two kilometers that separated them from the forest, itself occupied by heavily armed German soldiers. During the fight, fire broke out in the city, both from gunfire and deliberate arson by the Germans. It destroyed many residential buildings on 3 Maja Street, among them the "Lux" cinema. A railway building also burned down – next to the railway crossing on Warszawska Street, where a driver training center is currently located.

The German gendarmerie was stationed in Hajnówka, housed in all three former primary schools (No. 1 and 2 on present-day Pilsudskiego Street and No. 3 on Placówka district on present-day Wróblewskiego Street). They constituted a real fighting force on the edge of the Białowieża Forest, primarily against partisan activity. In addition, there was a dozen or so German Schutzpolizei. Its commander was a ruthless and harsh SS man named Shot. The Germans established the Schultzpolzei at 22 Wierobieja street. Hajnówka also had a 12-person order gendarmerie, headquartered in brick building No. 2 on Warszawska Street, which currently houses a kindergarten. German offices and institutions operated in Hajnówka: the city hall office was located in the building of the State School of Timber Industry. The Employment Office was located in building no. 41 on 3 Maja Street. The Getrajdehandel (grain sales and purchase) was located.

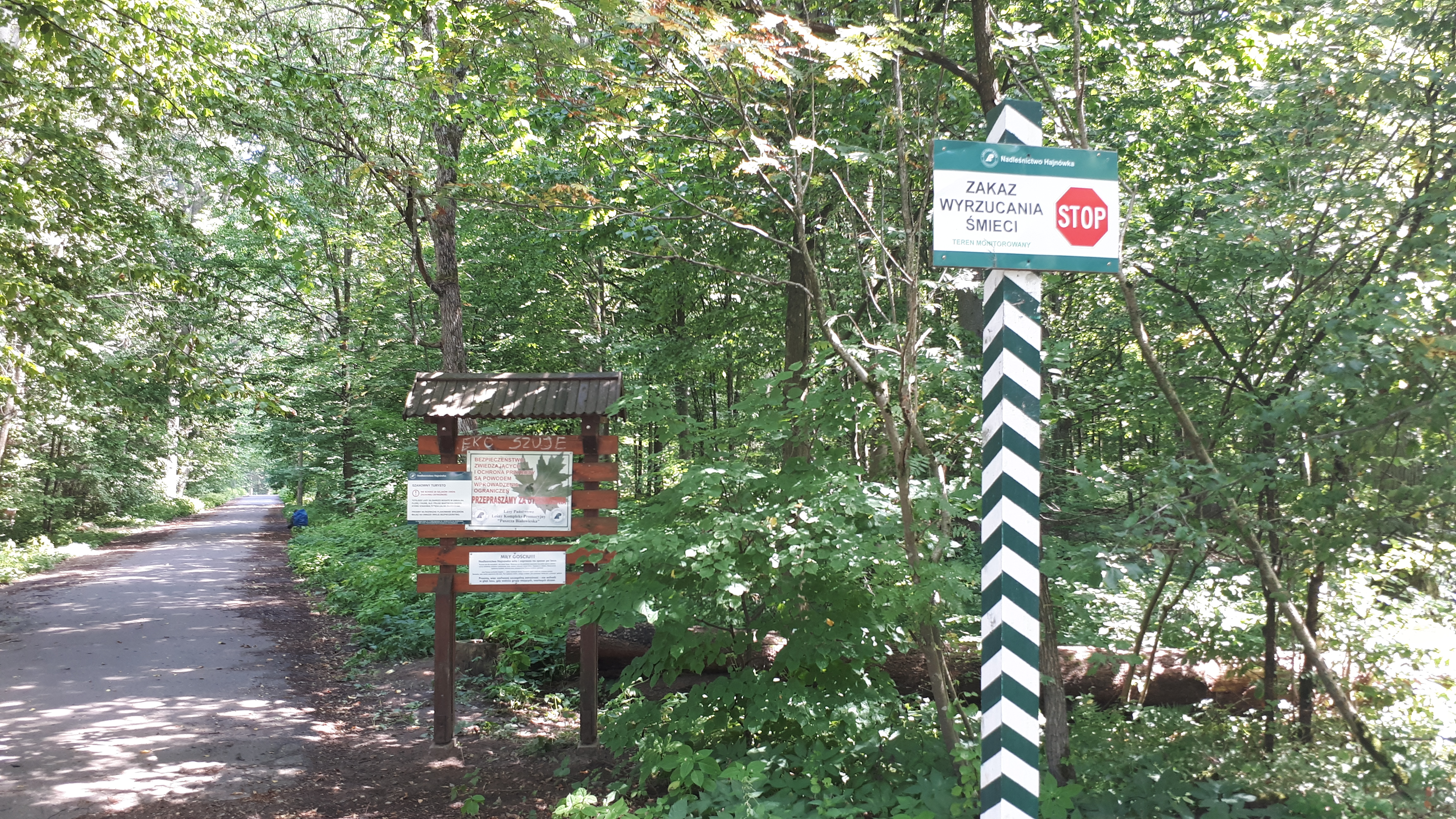
Białowieża Forest at the edges of the city, near Celna street

During the German occupation, the first high-voltage power line in the region was built, connecting Białystok with Hajnówka. This line marked the beginning of the future electrification of the surrounding villages.

In mid-September 1943 alone, over 53 people were murdered, their remains exhumed immediately after the war. On May 16, 1944, before the Germans left Hajnówka, they made the last arrest of a large group of about 18 people.

Before the Soviets entered, the Germans destroyed much of the city's infrastructure. They dismantled and transported by rail important structural elements of all power and production machinery from the two largest plants, the Sawmill and the Chemical Factory. They blew up the Hajnówka railway station building and completely destroyed all railway tracks throughout the area from which they were withdrawing. They burned down important industrial facilities, including the Sawmill and Chemical Factory, with incendiary shells. Surrounding villages were also burned down at this time. On July 18, 1944, Red Army troops of the 65th Army under the command of General Pavel Batov entered Hajnówka. The population at that time was approximately 8,000.

=== Communist period ===
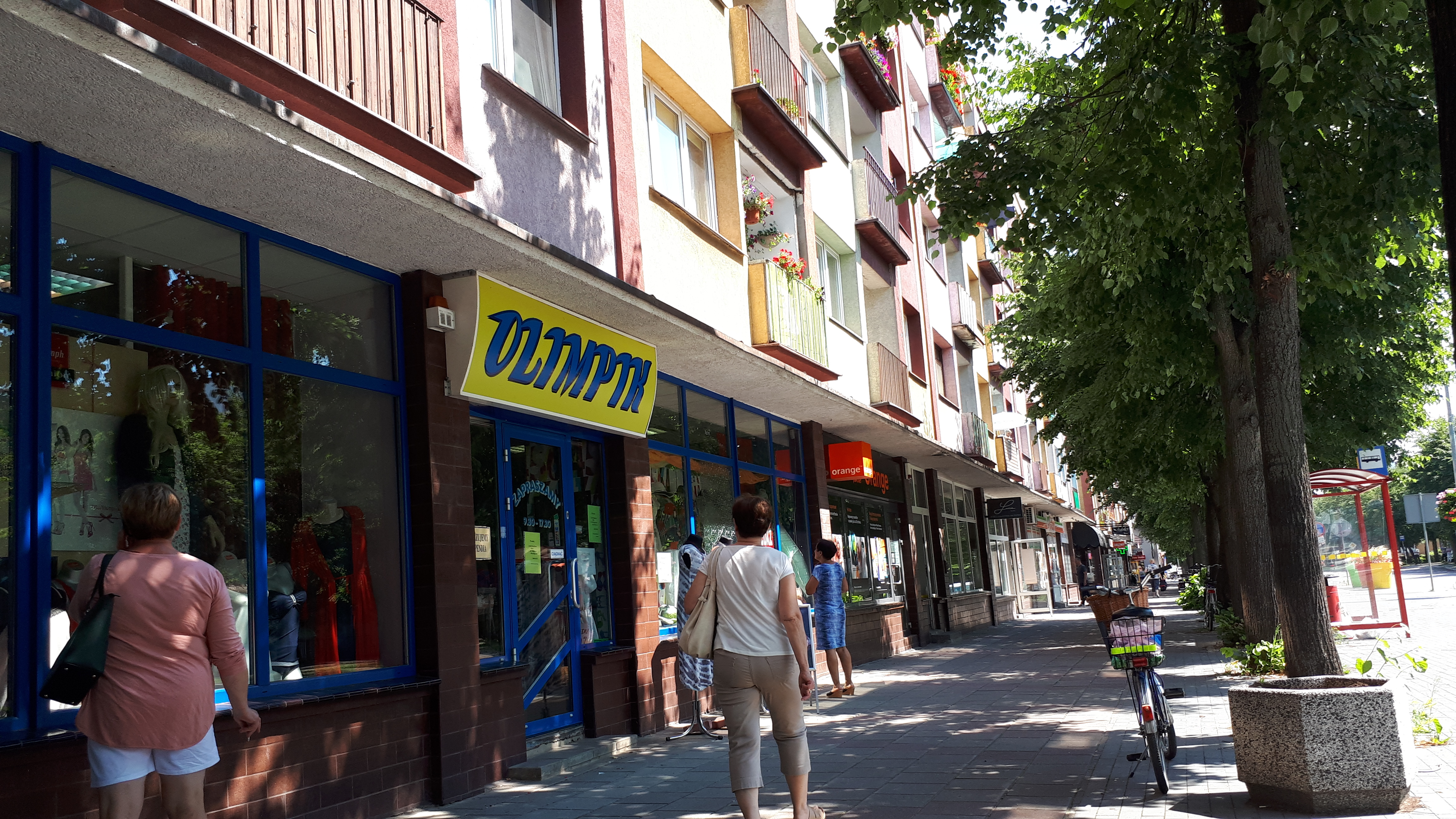
Shops at 3 Maja Street

Despite harsh conditions and infrastructural losses, life returned to Hajnówka quite soon. This attracted new settlers as well as pre-war inhabitants of the area, so the town quickly recovered. Also, the narrow streets were mostly rebuilt. In 1951, the town (until then formally a village) was granted with city rights and between 1954 and 1975 it even served as a seat of a powiat.

After the war, the Hajnówka Woodworks was rebuilt, and by the early 1980s, it employed over 1,800 people. In addition to the reconstruction of the three largest factories in the postwar period, new enterprises were established in Hajnówka: the "Forest" Cooperative, the Mleczarski Dairy Plant, the Polygon Construction and Renovation Cooperative, and others. Housing construction also developed very dynamically. It was conducted by three separate sectors: cooperative, municipal, and company. Individual construction was also widely preferred, with exceptionally favourable terms. Loans were granted for this purpose, bearing interest at 3% per year, with repayment over 25 years. The loan was conditional on owning a building plot and providing a 20% down payment. The plot was allocated by the state for perpetual usufruct, meaning it was practically free of charge, and the down payment typically included own labour, which amounted to approximately 20% of the construction costs. Between 1953 and 1960, the then Dry Wood Distillation Plant (now Gryfskand) constructed ten identical, two-story buildings, each containing eighteen two-room apartments with a kitchen. The buildings were located on what is now Batorego Street.

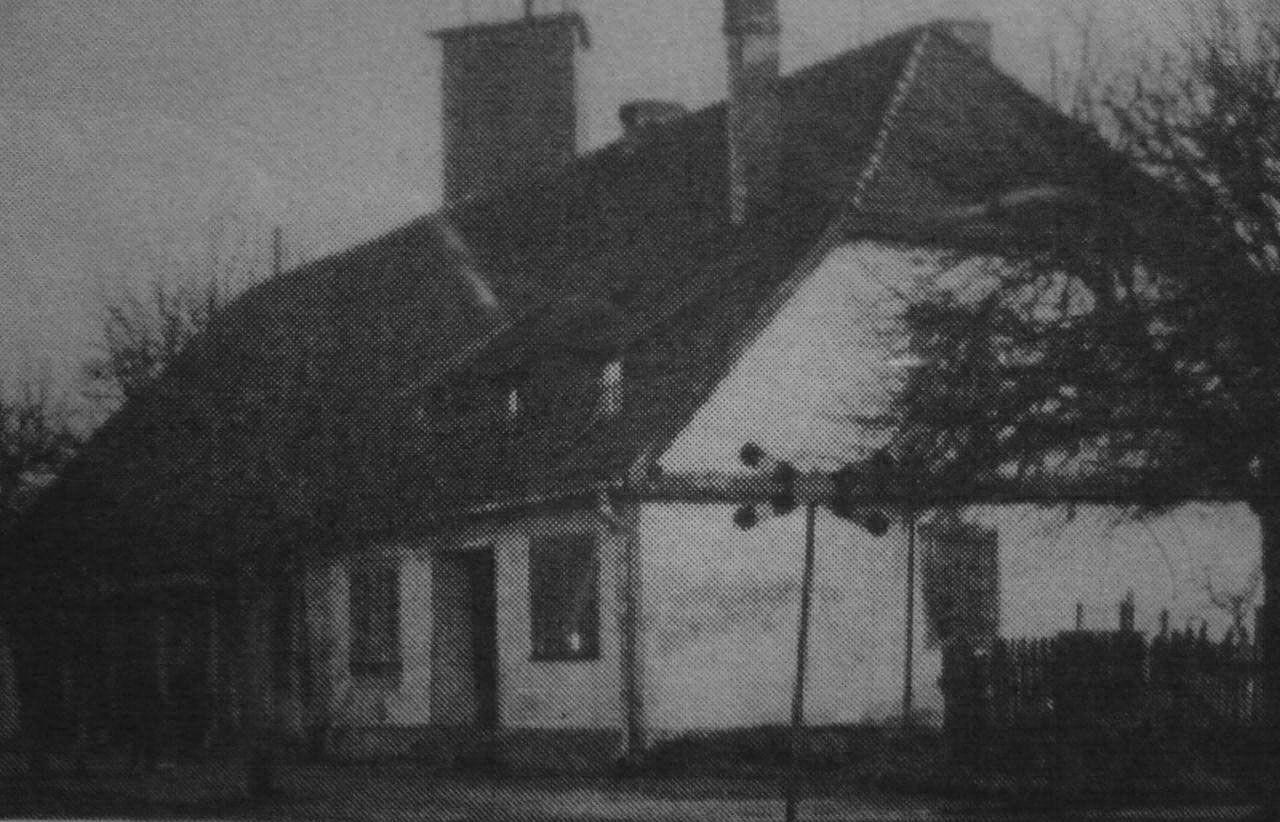
State Sawmill Fire Station (1960s) located in today's Parkowa District

In 1962 the Turpentine Works "Terebenthen" which was bounded by Parkowa, 3 Maja, Pilsudskiego, Armii Krajowej, and Białowieska Streets, was dismantled, and the machinery was given to the Chemical Factory. Following its closure, on the large territory it occupied at the city center, a wide range of facilities were built: current city park (opened in 1973), the City and County Office buildings, the Post Office, the housing estate behind them, the Teachers' House, the Bialystok University of Technology branch building, the District Clinic, the Cooperative Bank, the Zbigniew Orzechowski Memorial Hall, the Police Headquarters, the Amphitheater and the former garden and greenhouses of the Municipal Greenery.

=== Modern period ===
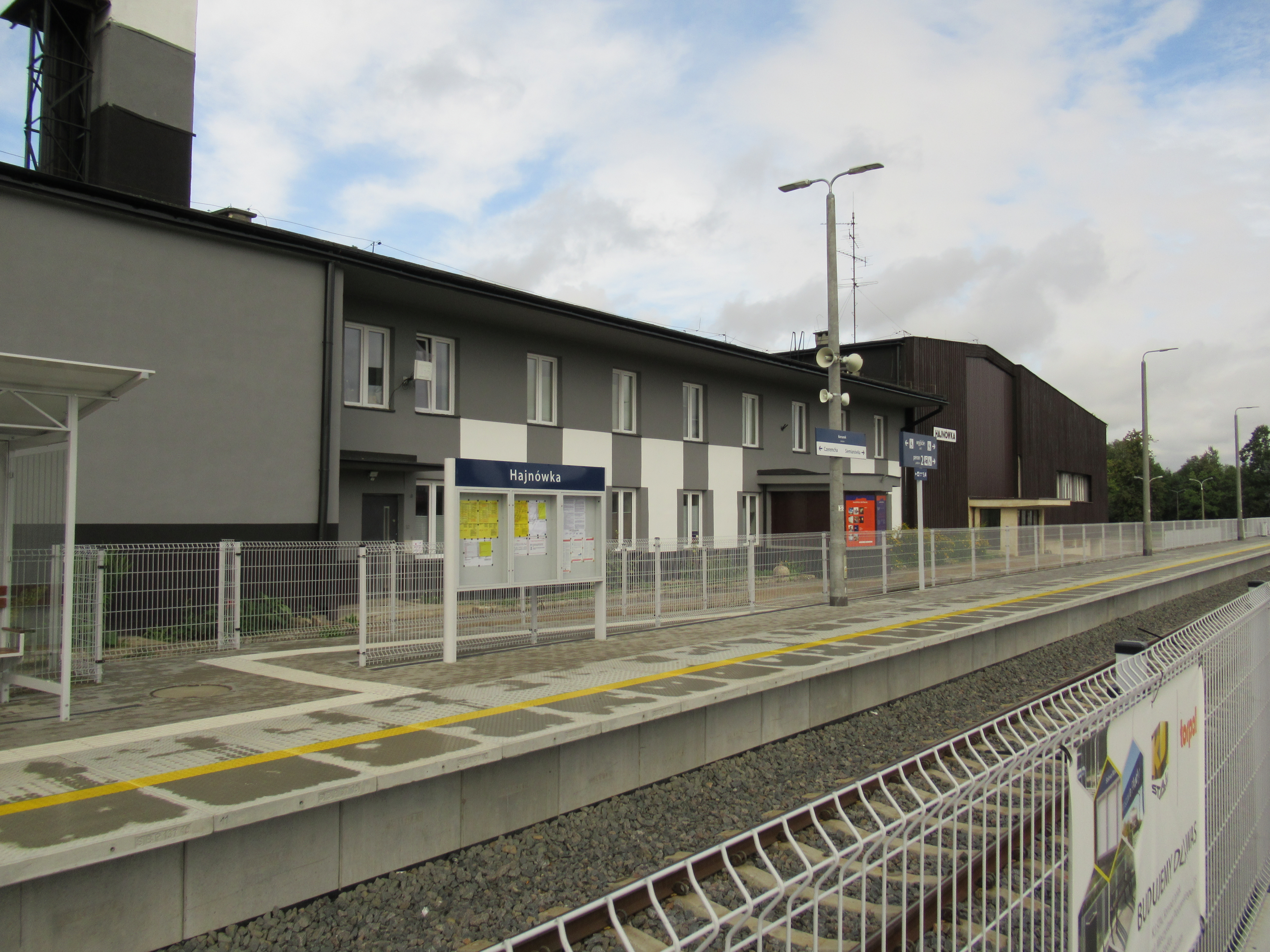
Hajnówka railway station

In 2005, the local timber factory expanded its production area to 17,500 sq.m, one of the largest in Europe. It is quite modern and used for manufacturing of furniture, mainly to be exported to Western Europe. In 2009, the Water Park was opened. In the late 2000s, the 11th new branch of the District Court in Bielsk Podlaski, the Tax Office, and a branch of the Bialystok University of Technology were opened. Hajnówka has 8 schools as well as 5 churches (Catholic and Eastern Orthodox), a hospitals, a sewer system, a swimming pool and a museum.

In 2025, a trial began in Hajnówka of five activists accused of helping migrants in the Białowieża National Park. The group became commonly known as the Hajnówka Five, although the trial subsequently moved to Białystok due to significant public interest.

=== Former names of Hajnówka's streets ===
- Agatowa: Fabryczna 4 (1920's-1962), Findera (1962-2017)
- Armii Krajowej: Kolejkowa (1930's-1962; part), Konopnickiej (1949-1962; part), Lenina (1962-1990)
- Bagienna: Żwirowa (1977-1989)
- Batorego: Batorego (1930's-1949; not during German occupation), Bismarckstrasse (German Occupation), Waryńskiego (1949-1990)
- Białostocka: Placówka/Fabryczna 1 (until 1949), Dzierżyńskiego (1949-1990)
- Białowieska: Graniczna (1930's-1942), Ogrodowa (1942-1945), Majdan (1945-1949), Armii Czerwonej (1949-1990)
- Bohaterów Warszawy: Nowe Parcele 2 (1930's-1949), Duboisa 2 (1949-1962)
- Brylantowa: Fabryczna 5 (1920's-1962), Fornalskiej (1962-2017)
- Bursztynowa: Fabryczna 8 (1920's-1962), Rutkowskiego (1962-2017)
- Diamentowa: Fabryczna 7 (1920's-1962), Kniewskiego (1962-2017)
- Duboisa: Nowe Parcele 1 (1930's-1949), Duboisa 1 (1949-1962)
- Dziewiatowskiego: Batorego (1930's-1949; not during German occupation), Bismarckstrasse (German Occupation), Waryńskiego (1949-1990), Batorego (1990-1995)
- Fabryczna: Fabryczna 3 (1920's-1962), Nowotki (1962-1990)
- Grunwaldzka: Polna (1930's-1949; not during Soviet and German occupation), Polewoja (Soviet occupation), Schubertstrasse (German Occupation), Prusa (1949-1962)
- Jarzębinowa: Rampa Reźnika 5 (1920's-1949), Proletariacka 5 (1949-1962), Jarzębiowa (1962-1980)
- Jastrzębia: Gubernia 1 (1930's-1949), Podlasie 1 (1949-1962), Jarzębia (1962-1980)
- Jaśminowa: Rampa Reznika 9 (1930's-1949), Proletariacka 9 (1949-1962)
- Jaworowa: Rampa Reznika 10 (1930's-1949), Proletariacka 10 (1949-1962)
- Jelenia: Fabryczna 11 (1930's-1962)
- Jesionowa: Rampa Reznika 4 (1930's-1949), Proletariacka 4 (1949-1962)
- Kochanowskiego: Staroleśna 3 (1930's-1962)
- Kołodzieja: Kozi Przeskok (1930's-1949)
- Konopnickiej: Kolonia Robotnicza (1930's-1949), Konopnickiej 1 (1949-1962)
- Kosidłów: Ogrodowa (1930's-1949), Kosidły (1949-1962)
- Kościuszki: Nowe Parcele 6 (1930's-1949), Duboisa 6 (1949-1962)
- Kryształowa: Fabryczna 6 (1920's-1962), Hibnera (1962-2017)
- Lema: Armii Ludowej (1949-2017)
- Leszczynowa: Rampa Reznika 7 (1930's-1949), Proletariacka 7 (1949-1962)
- Lipowa: Lipowa (until 1949), 1 Maja (1949-1962)
- Łosia: Fabryczna 12 (1920's-1962)
- Międzytory: Osiedle Międzytory (1930's-1949), Międzytory (1949-1962)
- Mickiewicza: Siwa Kolonia (1930's-1949), Staroleśna 1 (1949-1962)
- Myśliwska: Judzianka 3 (1949-1962)
- Nałkowskiej: Kolonia Robotnicza (1930's-1949), Konopnickiej 3 (1949-1962)
- Niedźwiedzia: Fabryczna 15 (1920's-1962)
- Orzechowa: Rampa Reznika 8 (1930's-1949), Proleteriacka 8 (1949-1962)
- Orzeszkowej: Kolonia Robotnicza (1930's-1949), Konopnickiej 2 (1949-1962)
- Parkowa: Graniczna (1930's-1942), Ogrodowa (1942-1945), Majdan (1945-1949), Armii Czerwonej (1949-1989)
- Piłsudskiego: Tartaczna (?-?), Piłsudskiego (until 1945), Wyzwolenia (1945-1990)
- Ponieckiej: Kolonia Robotnicza (1930's-1949), Osiedle Konopnickiej (1949-1962), Sawickiej (1962-2014)
- Prusa: Czworaki (1930's-1949), Osiedle Żeromskiego (1949-1962)
- Ptaszyńskiego: Nowe Parcele 4 (1930's-1949), Duboisa 4 (1949-1962)
- Skłodowskiej-Curie: Kolonia Robotnicza (1930's-1949), Osiedle Konopnickiej (1949-1962)
- Słowackiego: Siwa Kolonia (1930's-1949), Staroleśna 2 (1949-1962)
- Sołoniewicz: Placówka/Fabryczna 1 (1920's-1949), Dzierżyńskiego (1949-1990), Białostocka (1990-2005)
- Sportowa: Kolonia Chemiczna 1 (1950's-1962)
- Staszica: Czworaki (1930's-1949), Konopnickiej 5 (1949-1962)
- Szmaragdowa: Fabryczna 9 (1920's-1962), Krasickiego (1962-2017)

== Geography ==
Hajnówka is located in the Bielsk Lowland, in the southeastern part of the Podlaskie Voivodeship close to the border with Belarus and covers an area of 2,130 hectares. It lies at the western edge of the Białowieża Forest and is called the "gateway to the Białowieża Forest" as it is the largest settlement located directly next to Białowieża. The Leśna River flows through the town.

=== Urban layout ===
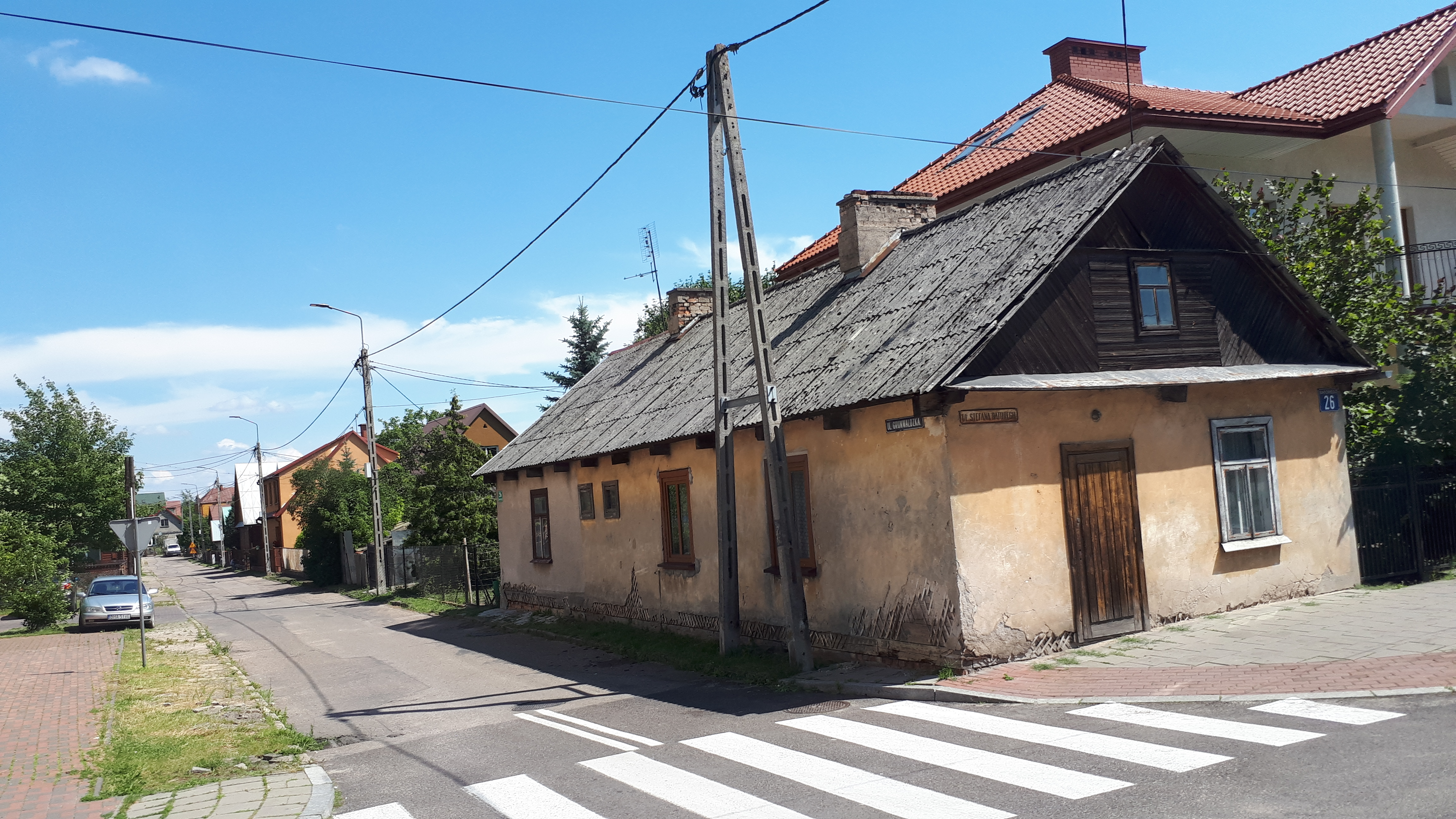
Intersection of Grunwaldzka and Batorego streets

Hajnówka developed as a settlement near the forest ranger's headquarters, which was located on the site of the current Placówka district and the OSiR center. The oldest settlements were concentrated along the 18th-century route from Bielsk Podlaski to Białowieża (present-day Stefana Batorego Street), then Lipowa Street, along which the village developed in the 19th century, and then along the crossroads (Wierobieja Street, Grunwaldzka Street, and 11 Listopada Street). The development of the urban structure occurred spontaneously and accompanied the development of manufacturing functions. The processes of intensive urbanization in the city during the interwar period proceeded chaotically, traces of which remain to this day. Consequently, Hajnówka, unlike urban structures based on various types of location systems, but also unlike some of the new towns of the Polish People's Republic period, lacks a clear structure organized around a central space. In addition to the industrial functions in the city structure, which played a significant role in the current spatial layout, one can distinguish buildings that originally served as commercial spaces. With the influx of Jewish residents, primarily engaged in trade, Batorego, Polna (now Grunwaldzka), and Targowa (now Wierobieja) streets gained the status of a commercial district.

== Politics ==
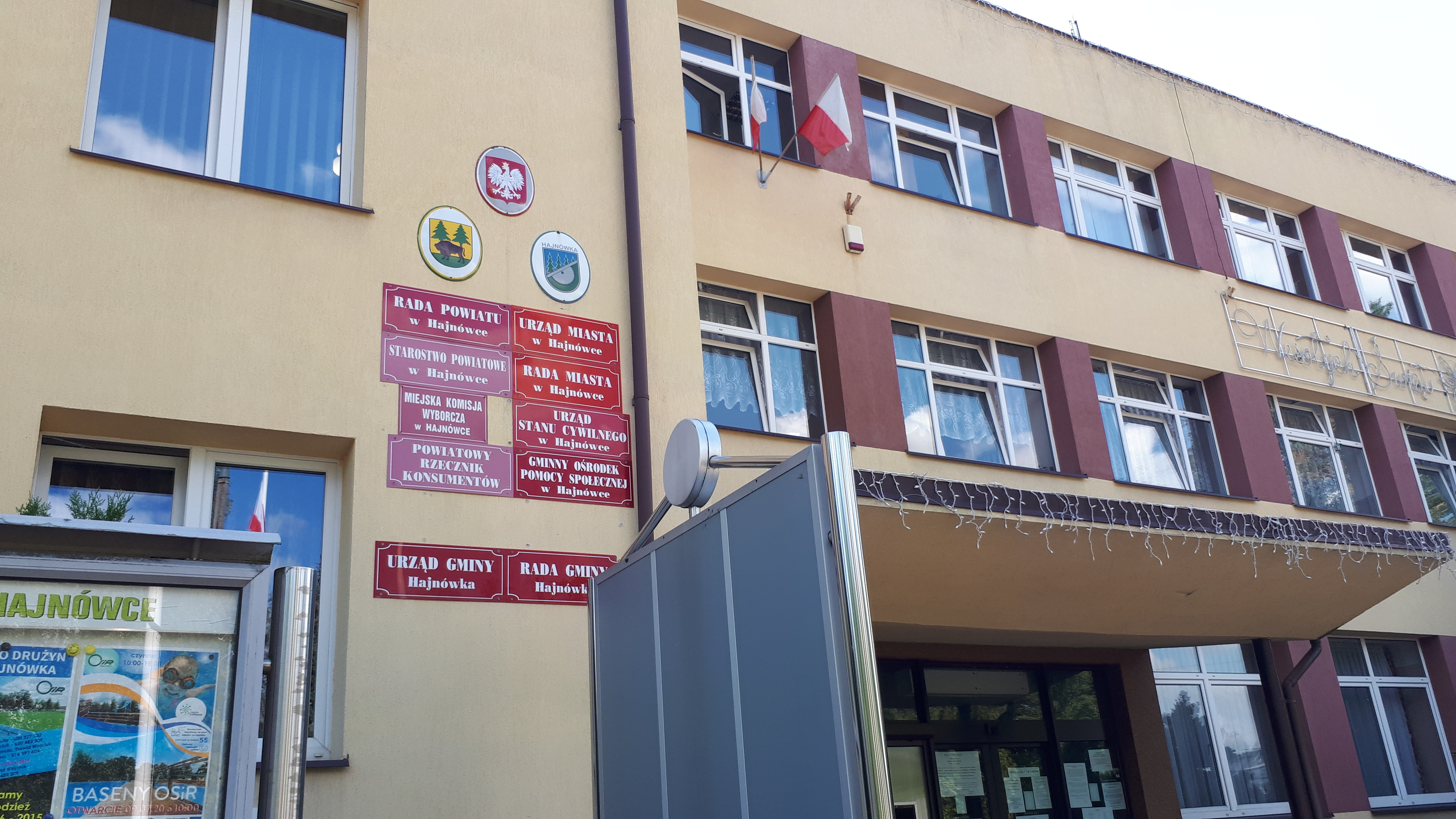
Hajnówka city and county hall

The responsibilities of Hajnówka's president include drafting and implementing resolutions, enacting city bylaws, managing the city budget, employing city administrators, and preparing against floods and natural disasters. The president fulfills his duties with the help of the City Council and the city administration. The city council (Polish: Rada Miasta Hajnówka) consists of 15 deputies (Until 2024 it had 21 deputies). In the 2024 local election Ireneusz Kiendyś was elected as mayor and in the vote to the city council the Hajnówka Samorządowcy received 10 mandates, followed by Hajnówka Razem (4 mandates) and Niezależni Samorządowcy (1 mandate).

=== 2006 election ===
The 2006 local election and were won by Agreement list (8 mandates), to be folllowed by Białorusko - Ludowy (6 mandates), Law and Justice (4 mandates) and Civic Platform (3 mandates).

=== City heads ===
==== Second Polish Republic ====
- Leopold Kowalczyk (mid 30s to 1939)

==== Communist period ====
- 1944- Antoni Jedruszek
- Michal Borowik
- Władysław Pikulski

===== Chairman of the Presidium of the MRN =====
- Henryk Tomaszewski
- Wlodzimierz Nalewajko
- Michał Lemberg
- Konstanty Leszczyński (1961-1974)

===== Naczelnik Miasta =====
Following the 1975 administrative reform the executive was once again separated from the legislative branch and for cities less than 100,000 inhabitants, a mayor called Naczelnik miasta was appointed.

- Jerzy Sahajdak
- Anatol Ginszti
- Stanislaw Kostera (1976-1989)

==== Modern period ====
- Mieczysław Gmiter (1990-1992)
- Mikołaj Nieścieruk (1992-1994)
- Jadwiga Rudzińska-Patejuk (1994-1998)
- Anatol Ochryciuk (1998-2010)
- Jerzy Sirak (2010-2024)
- Ireneusz Kiendyś (2024 - incumbent)

== Economy ==
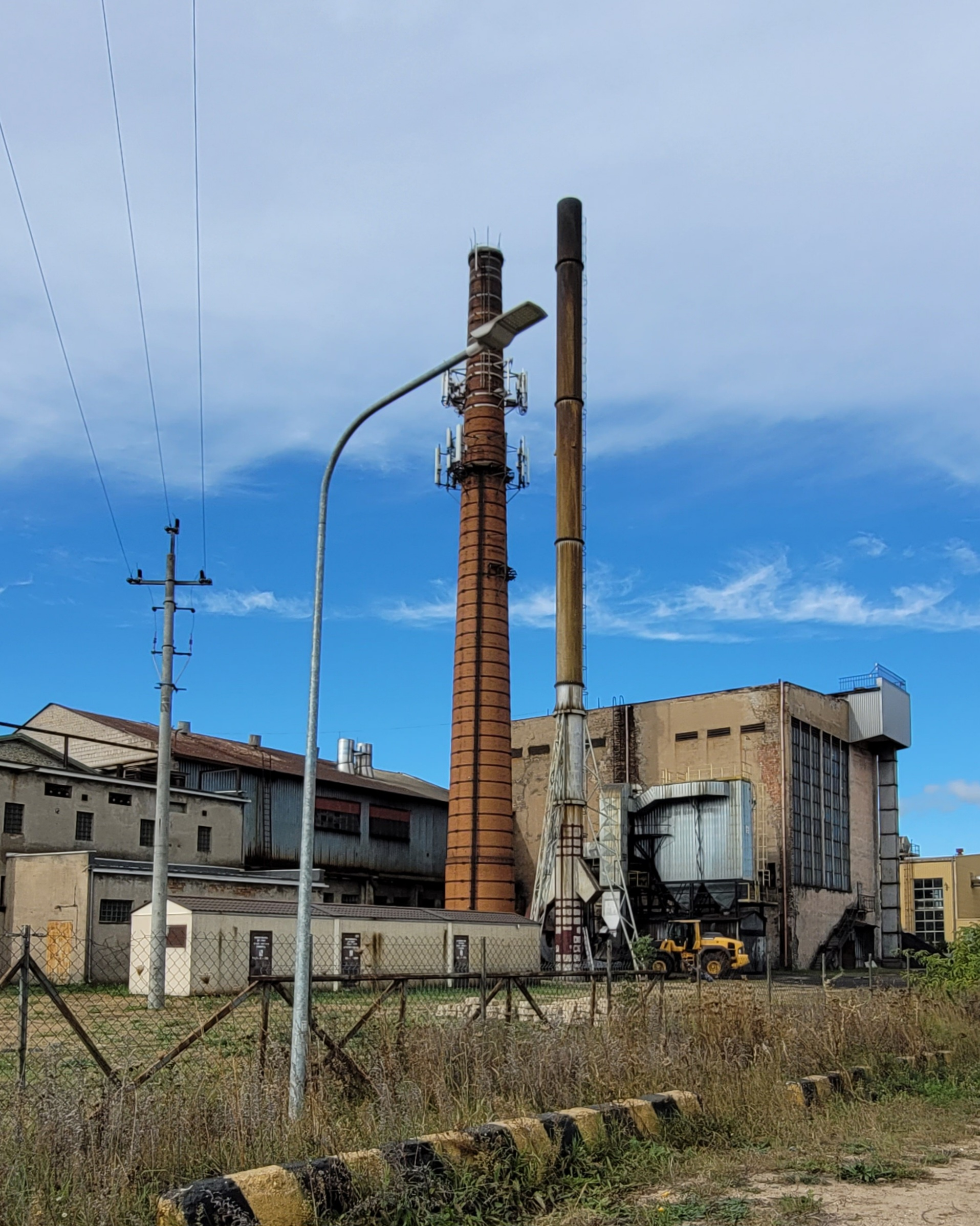
The Wood Works

Due to the proximity of the town to Białowieża Forest, the forestry and its related industries traditionally played major role in the city's economic life and development. Before the war, the forest office and its divisions occupied a large, fenced areas of several hectares, where they operated their own, so-called "company" farms. These included arable fields, pastures, meadows, well-maintained vegetable gardens. The Hajnówka forest office (Polish: Nadleśnictwo Hajnówka), with its largest headquarters, was located in the area between Batorego, Białostocka, Soloniewicza, and Wróblewskiego Streets. To the southeast, this area was bordered by a river and, further on, a narrow-gauge railway. In the postwar years, the area saw the construction of, among other things, a Community Center, a Sports Stadium, the Czerlonka Regional Promotion Center, an entire housing estate, and Sportowa, Chpina, Moniuszki, and Nadbrzezna Streets. The headquarters building of this forest district was located exactly where the locker room of the Football Sports Club is now located, and where Sportowa Street once stood was a vegetable garden.

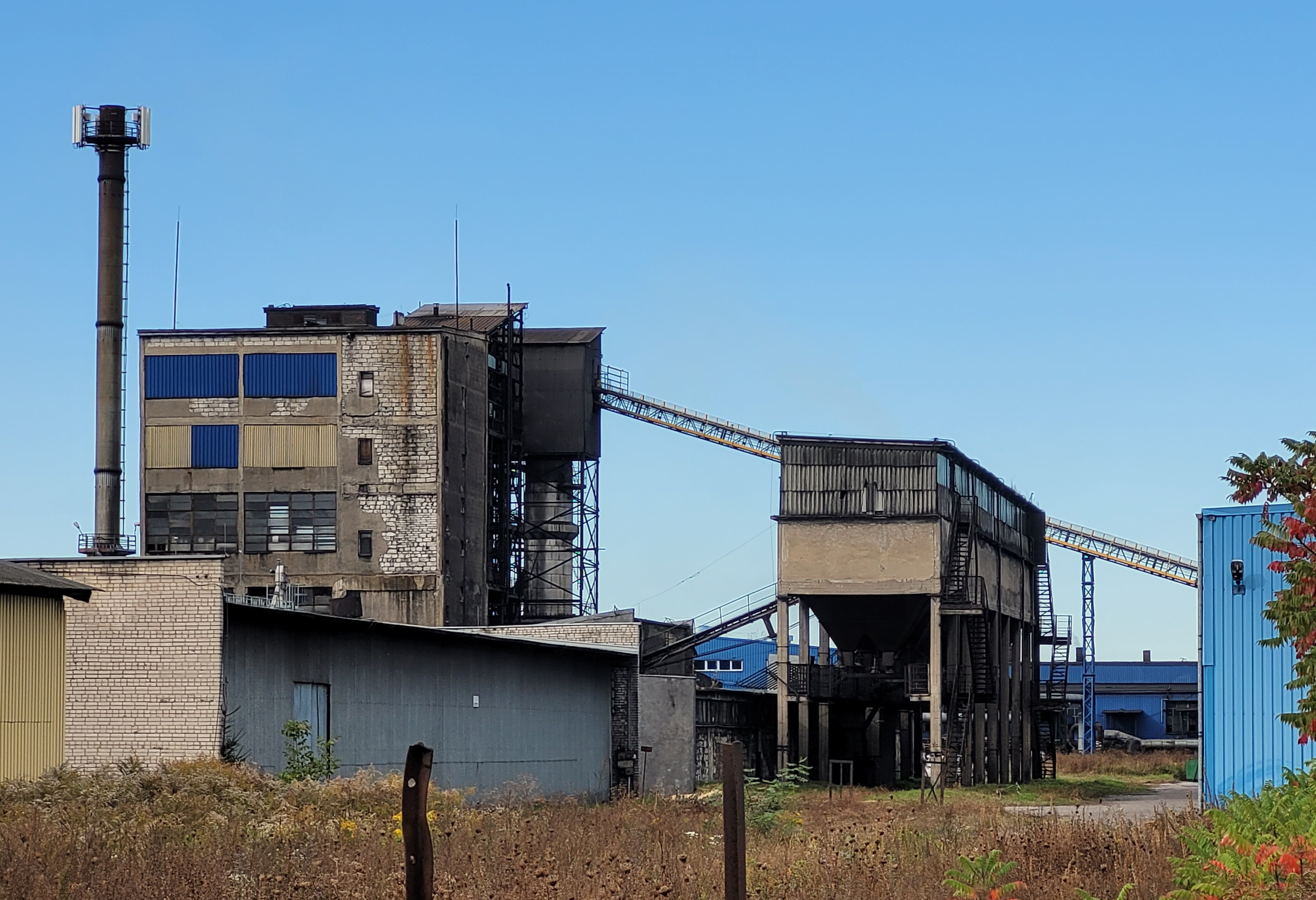
Chemical Factory

The last forester was Józef Chorazy who was deported to the Soviet Union in 1940 and killed in the Katyn massacre. The headquarters of the "Lesna" Forest District and Forestry Office was located on the other side of Batorego Street. On the western side, the area is bounded by the railway track, and on the southeast, by 3 Maja Street and the river. Currently, the site houses the Church of the Holy Trinity and other Orthodox parish buildings, as well as a housing estate and a carpentry workshop. The Starzyna Forest District was located on the western side, at the corner of Batorego and Lipowa Streets. Currently, there are apartment blocks there. This is part of the area that belonged to the so-called Hajnówka Guard in the early days of Hajnówka. The Hajnówka Forest District occupied a substantial area around its headquarters, located between Mikolaja Reja and 3 Maja Streets. On the western side, it was bordered by vacant land, which now houses part of a housing estate and the Skłodowska High School.

The Chemical Factory established originally in 1917 by the German occupation authorities. It is located in the former Placówka district. It is demarcated by the following boundaries: on the eastern side, by streets Białostocka and Tamary Soloniewicz; on the southern side, by the urban area adjacent to ks. Antoni Dziewatowski, to the west - the railway track, and to the north the private fields of the village of Dubiny (currently built up). This area consists largely of industrial facilities and, to a much smaller extent, to the southeast, a housing estate composed of former German barracks. In 1996 it was privatized and renamed "Gryfskand Ltd".

Despite losing its industrial role, Hajnówka still provides a significant base for the labour market and is a source of employment for residents of surrounding villages.

== Demographics ==
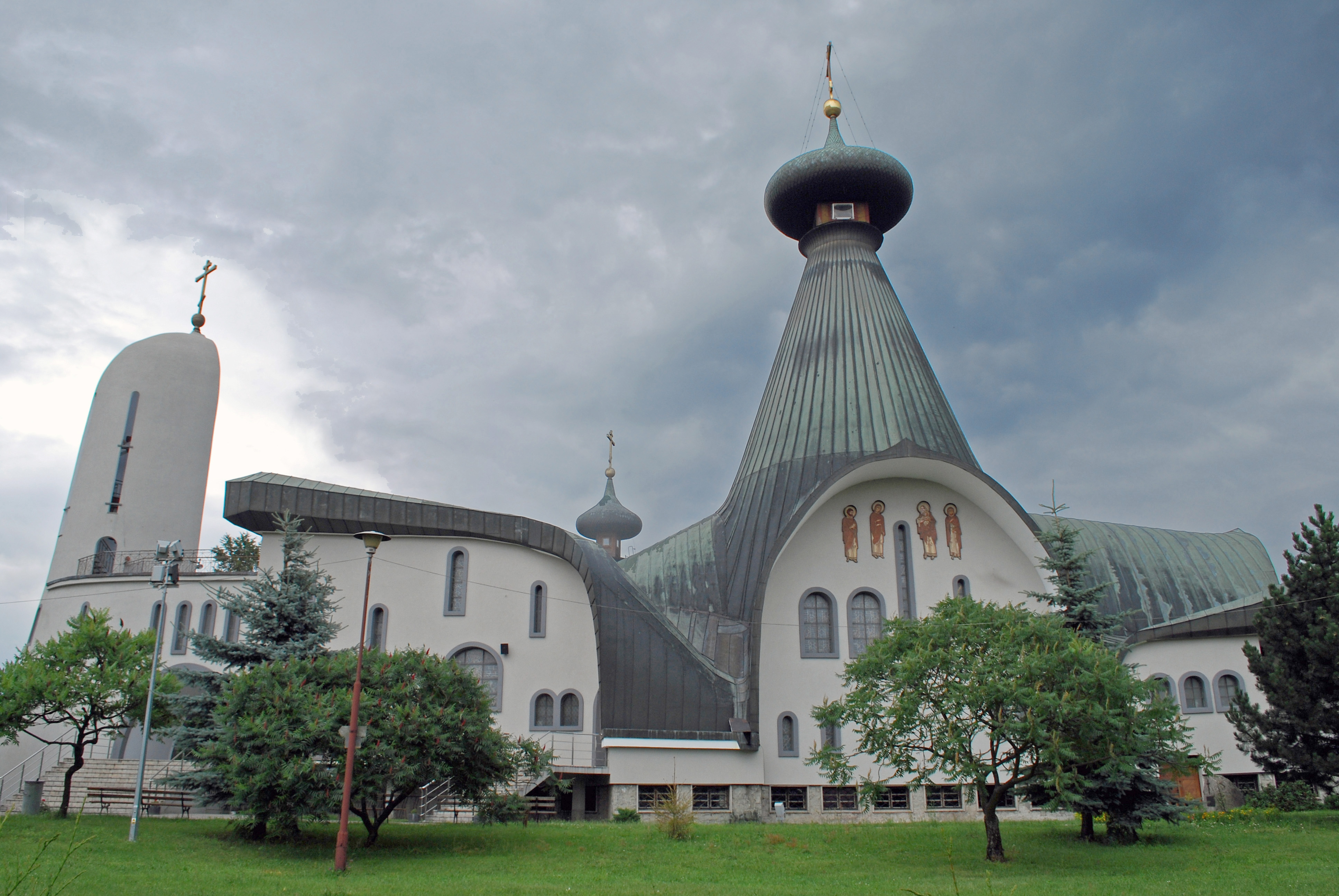
Church of the Holy Trinity

2002 – 22,545 inhabitants:

- Poles – 72.5% (16,347);
- Belarusians – 26.4% (5,954);
- Ukrainians – 0.5% (103);
- Other – 0.6% (141).

1921 – 748 inhabitants:

- Poles – 80.9% (605);
- Belarusians – 13.8% (103);
- Jews – 0.8% (6);
- Other – 4.5% (34).

=== Jews ===
Jews settled in Hajnówka at the end of the 19th century. It was one of the youngest Jewish communities in the Grodno Governorate. The influx of Jews was the result of the development of the timber industry and access to the railway line (from 1906). However, the Jewish community was not established until just before World War I. In 1921, there were 748 Jews in the city. In 1937, Hajnówka had about 12,000 inhabitants, including about 250 Jews. In the years 1939-1942, about 600 Jews lived in Hajnówka. The largest concentration of Jewish houses and squares was located near the main synagogue on Targowa Street (now Wierobieja), Kosidłów street (Ogrodowa before the war), Lipowa street, Boczna street, on Orzechowskich Square, in the so-called Zaułek Mlynarski and in the vicinity of the Jewish school at Sokola house on Polna Street (now Grunwaldzka). Opposite the school there was a mikveh built shortly before the war and demolished in 1940. The local Jews were buried in the Jewish cemeteries in Narewka and Orla. The last rabbi was Jehuda Lejb. The main synagogue (there was still a small house of prayer) was built on a stone foundation around 1927/8 made of wooden logs. It was located on Targowa Street. The second entrance was from Północna Street for women. The synagogue was burned down by the Germans on June 25, 1941 by throwing hand grenades into the interior.

In August 1941, the Germans decided to place all Jews living in Hajnówka in a ghetto established in Pruzhany and a smaller group, at the ghetto in Narew. On a designated day, all Jewish families were to leave their homes early in the morning, leaving everything intact. They were allowed to take only small carry-on luggage. Women, children under 14, and the elderly were loaded onto trucks. They were beaten mercilessly, both as they were led from their homes and as they were herded into cars. The rest, however, were herded on foot toward Białowieża. Those who could not endure this deathly march were finished off with stakes and buried in roadside ditches. Among the victims was a local doctor Antoni Regirer.

=== Orthodox ===
From 1942, the Orthodox residents of Hajnówka also had their own parish and Orthodox church, located in a converted building of the former Forest District. Priest Serafim Żeleźniakowicz was the builder of this church and the pastor of the first Orthodox parish in Hajnówka, established at that time on his initiative. By the end of the 1960s the orthodox population in the city sharply increased, mainly as a result of immigration of orthodox population from the surrounding villages which made the situation critical. In the 1970s, the local parson, Antoni Dziewiatkowski began advocating for receiving permission to build a new church, the Church of the Holy Trinity which was consecrated in 1992.

== Notable people ==
- Tomasz Adamiec (born 1982), judoka
- Mariusz Anikiej (born 1972), musician
- Przemysław Sadowski (born 1975), actor
- Tomasz Samojlik (born 1978), scientist, biologist, environmental historian, cartoonist
