= Church of the Holy Trinity, Hajnówka =

Church in Podlaskie Voivodeship, Poland

Church of the Holy Trinity in Hajnówka
- Sobór Św. Trójcy w Hajnówce
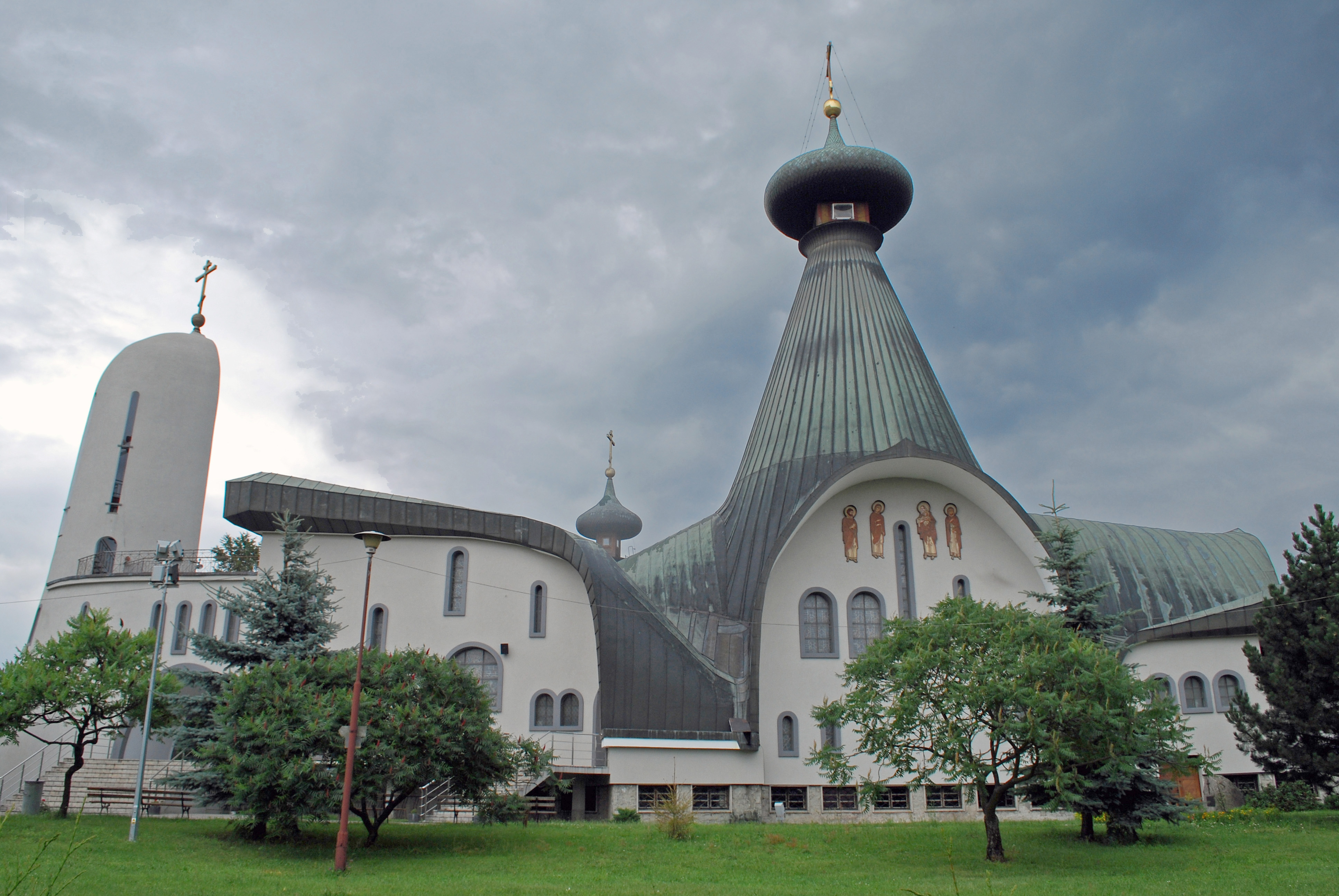
- Church of the Holy Trinity in Hajnówka
- 52.7457°N 23.5789°E
- Location: 15 Dziewiatowskiego, Hajnówka
- Denomination: Polish Orthodox Church
- Website: sobor.pl

History
- Dedication: Holy Trinity
- Consecrated: October 11, 1992

Architecture
- Years built: 1972–1992

Specifications
- Capacity: 5,000 people

Administration
- Parish: Holy Trinity parish in Hajnowka

Church of the Holy Trinity in Hajnówka (Polish: Sobór Św. Trójcy w Hajnówce) is an Orthodox parish church located in Hajnówka, a town in Podlaskie Voivodeship in eastern Poland. It belongs to the Hajnówka deanery of the Warsaw-Bielsko diocese of the Polish Orthodox Church. The church is located at 15 Dziewiatowskiego Street.

== History ==
Prior to the construction of the church, Hajnowka had only a temporary orthodox church which was opened in 1942 and located at a wooden building of the forestry office, adapted for this purpose. This church was small and in a bad technical condition. By the end of the 60s the orthodox population in the city sharply increased, mainly as a result of immigration of orthodox population from the surrounding villages which made the situation critical. In the 1970s, the local parson, Antoni Dziewiatkowski began advocating for receiving permission to build a new church. The church was built in 1974–1992 according to the design of Aleksander Grygorowicz and Jerzy Nowosielski and consecrated on October 11, 1992. Iconostasis and some icons are the work of the Greek painter Dimitrios Antonopoulos. The two-story church (the lower church is named after St. Nicholas) can accommodate 5,000 prayers, making it one of the largest in the country. Since 1983, concerts of the International Festival of Orthodox Music "Hajnówka" have been held here, and since 2002, competition auditions and concerts.

On April 10, 2011, a commemorative plaque dedicated to Archbishop Miron (Chodakowski) was installed in the church.

== Architecture ==
The Holy Trinity Cathedral is one of the most interesting examples of contemporary architecture in Poland. The roof of the temple is made of irregularly interpenetrating concrete shells.

The interior is decorated with an unusual polychrome. The interior of the church was to be created by Jerzy Nowosielski, who received an official commission from Metropolitan Bazyli (Doroszkiewicz). The finished design of the polychrome met with the resistance of the parish priest. As a result, Nowosielski was forced to give up painting the church. In the central part of the church, there is a chandelier. It is a Greek cross, decorated with stained glass windows of the Mother of God and Slavic saints. The walls of the temple are decorated with stained glass windows, rarely found in Orthodox churches. There are seven altars in the Holy Trinity Cathedral in Hajnówka. The main one is dedicated to the Holy Trinity. In the northern aisle there is also an altar dedicated to the icon of the "Mother of God - Unexpected Joy", separated from the nave with a single-row iconostasis. On the upper level there is a baptistery dedicated to the local saint. Its walls are covered with polychromes with images of Kirill of Turov, st. Euphrosyne of Polotsk as well as icon of st. Gabriel of Białystok. There are three altars in the lower part of the cathedral. The largest of them is dedicated to St. Nicholas. On the right side you can find a small altar of Saint Barbara and on the left an altar in honor of St. Antoni Pechersky. Here, in the crypt, the body of the cathedral builder, Father Antoni Dziewiatowski, is buried. The last, seventh altar is under the belfry and is dedicated to Saint Pantaleon.
