= Zaluki =

Zaluki may refer to:

- Załuki, Podlaskie Voivodeship, a village in Poland
- Załuki, Warmian-Masurian Voivodeship, a village in Poland
- Zaluki, Croatia, a village near Matulji, Croatia
