= Luzany =

Luzany may refer to:

- Lužany (disambiguation), several places in Slovakia
- Łużany, Podlaskie Voivodeship, Poland
