= Kozi Las =

- Settlement
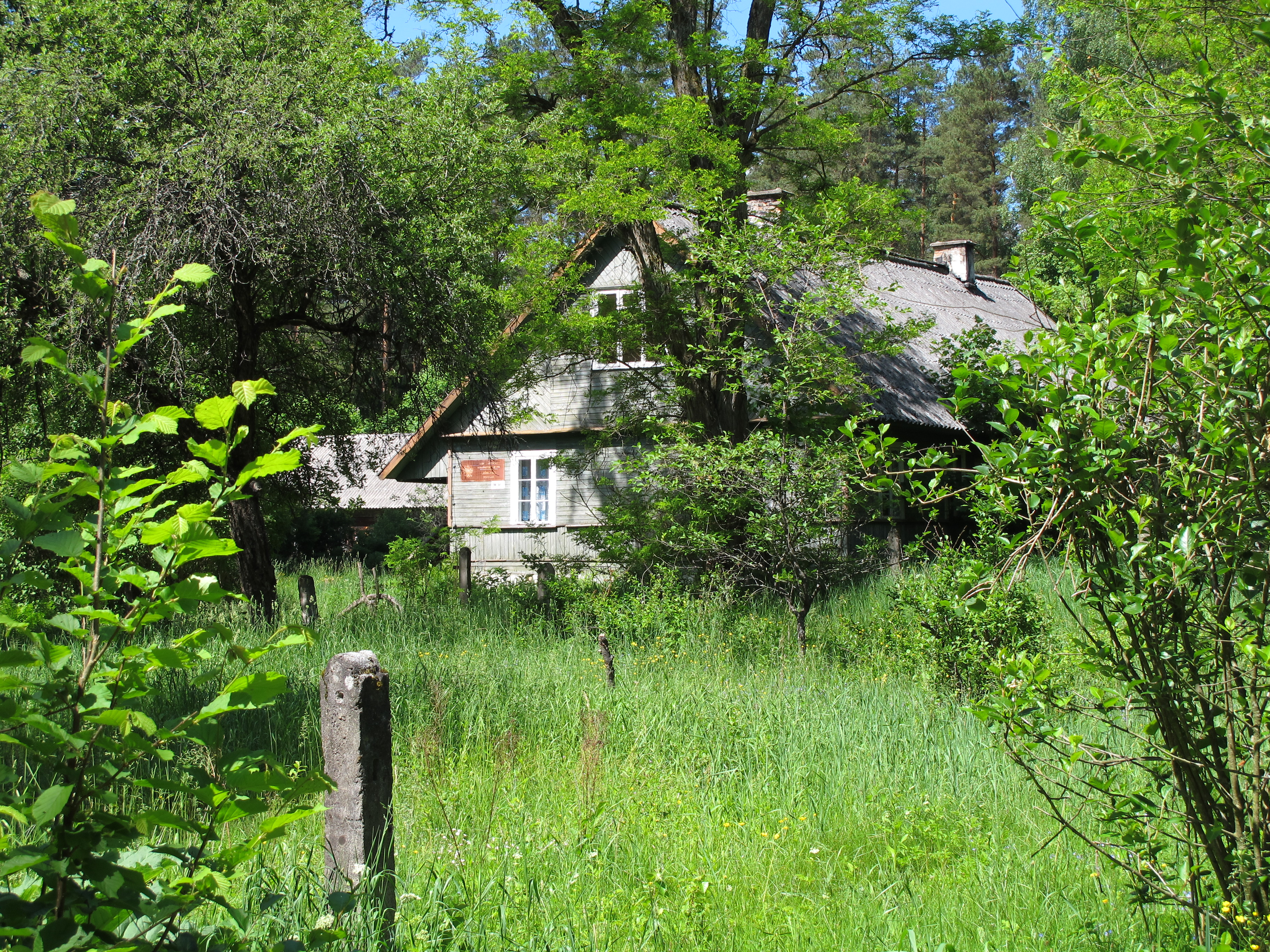

- Location within Poland
- Coordinates: 53°07′09″N 23°26′42″E
- Country: Poland
- Voivodeship: Podlaskie
- County: Białystok
- Gmina: Gródek

Kozi Las [ˈkɔʑi ˈlas] is a settlement in the administrative district of Gmina Gródek, within Białystok County, Podlaskie Voivodeship, in north-eastern Poland, close to the border with Belarus.
