= Ruda, Białystok County =

Village in Gmina Gródek, Poland

Ruda
- Village
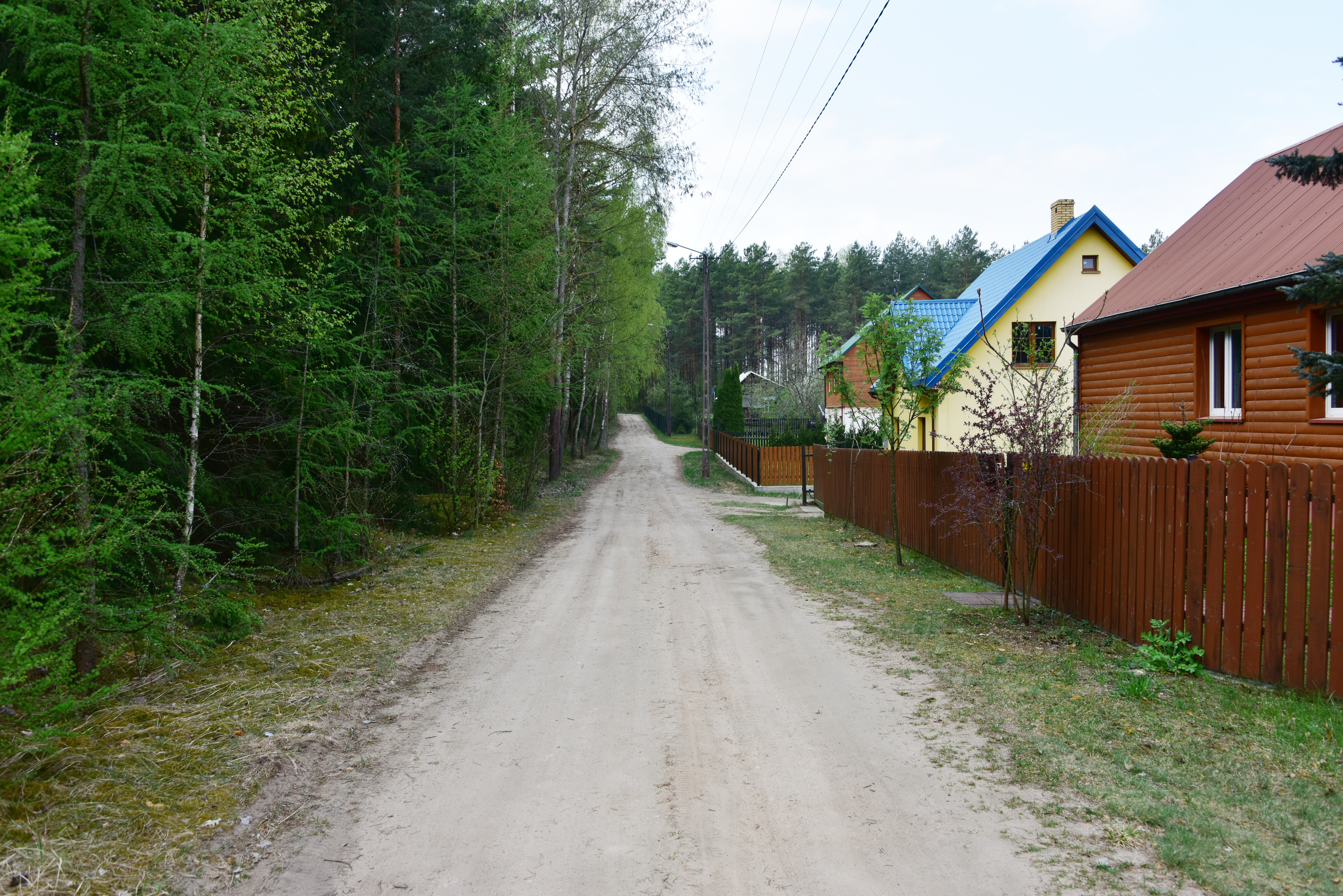

- Location within Poland
- Coordinates: 53°08′45″N 23°28′15″E
- Country: Poland
- Voivodeship: Podlaskie
- County: Białystok
- Gmina: Gródek

Ruda [ˈruda] is a village in the administrative district of Gmina Gródek, within Białystok County, Podlaskie Voivodeship, in north-eastern Poland, close to the border with Belarus.
