= Wyżary =

- Settlement
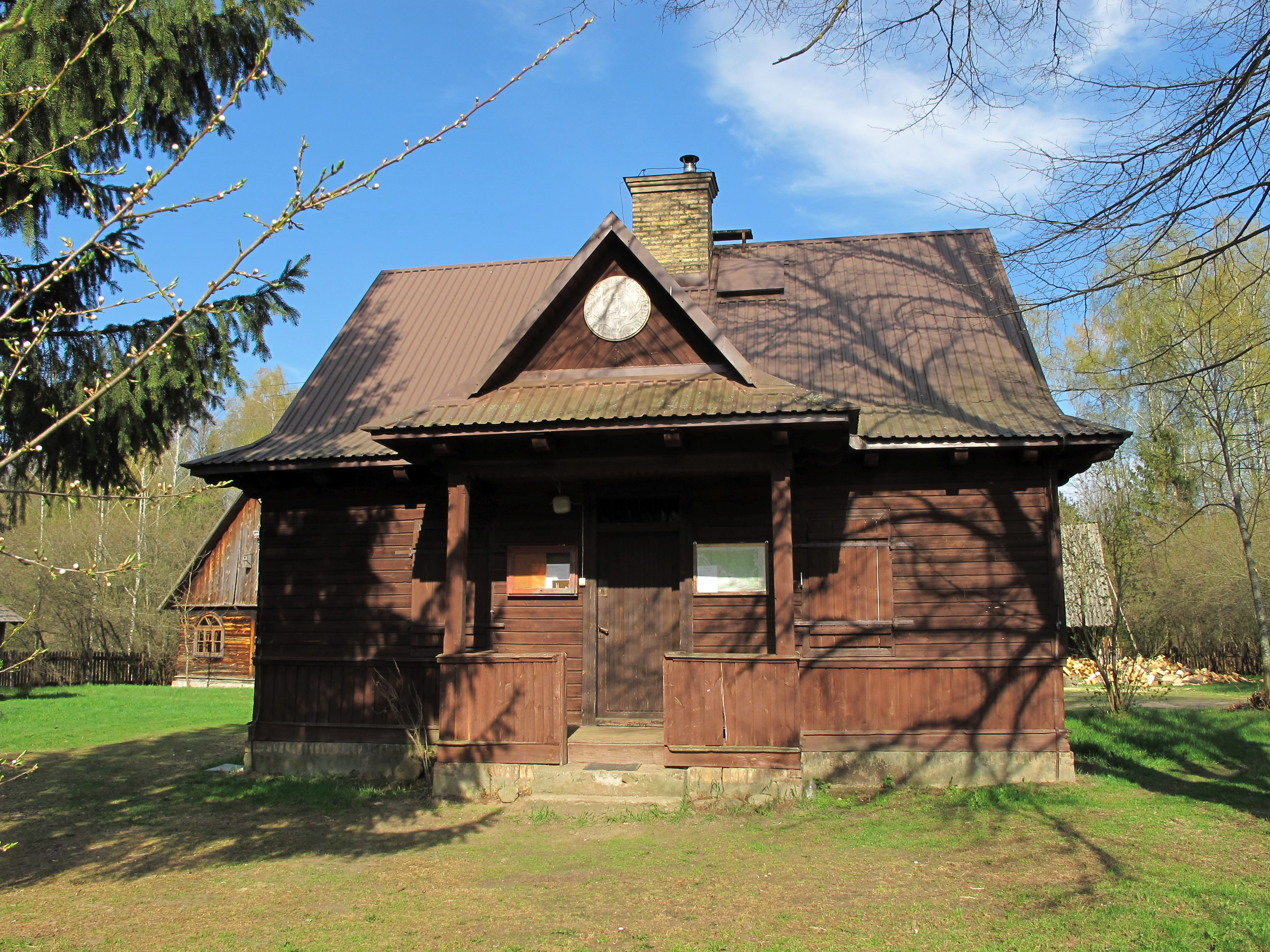

- Location within Poland
- Coordinates: 53°9′53″N 23°35′56″E
- Country: Poland
- Voivodeship: Podlaskie
- County: Białystok
- Gmina: Gródek
- Elevation: 146 m (479 ft)

Wyżary [vɨˈʐarɨ] is a settlement in the administrative district of Gmina Gródek, within Białystok County, Podlaskie Voivodeship, in north-eastern Poland, close to the border with Belarus.
