= Nowosiółki, Gmina Gródek =

Nowosiółki
- Village
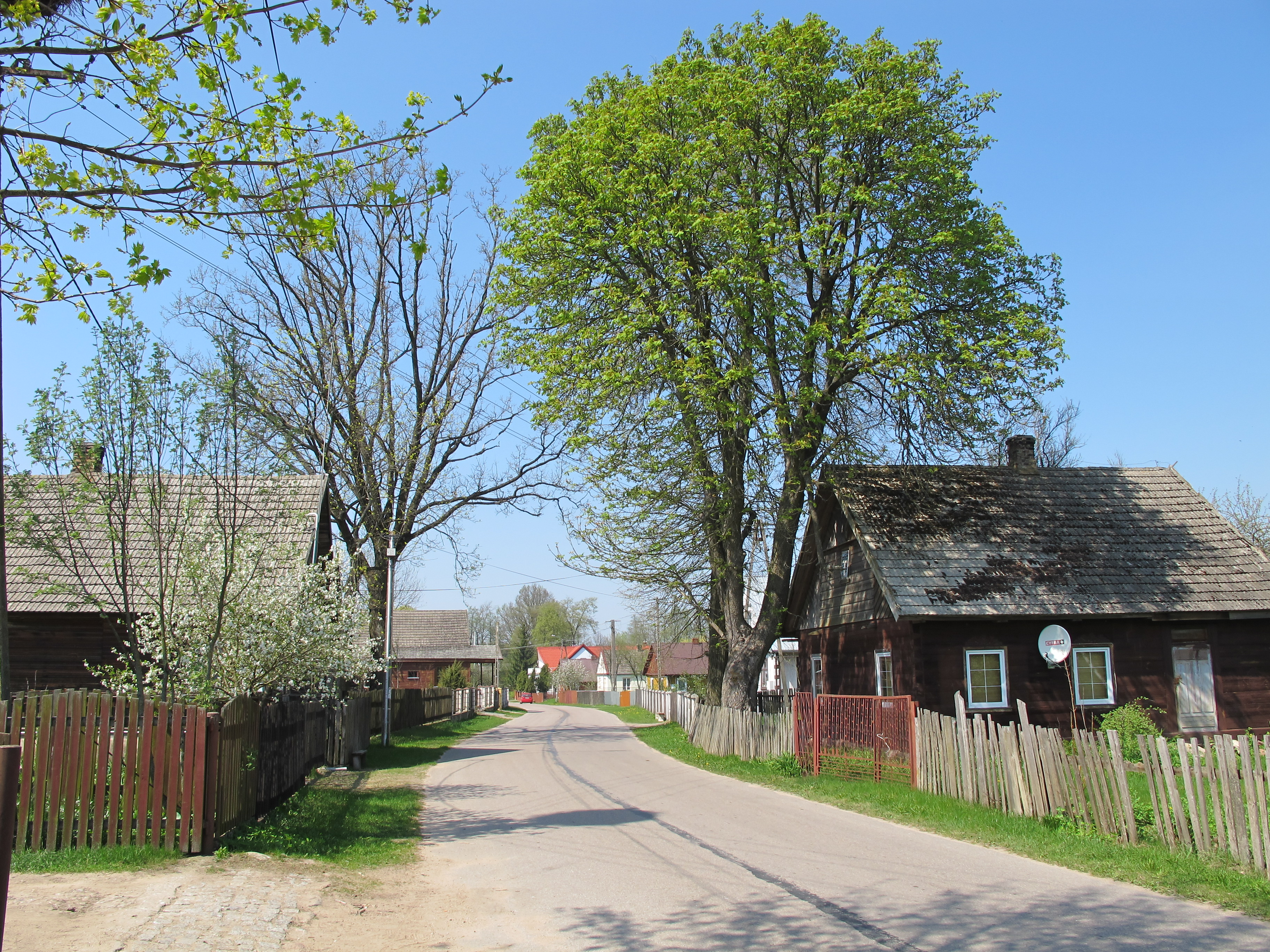
- Houses in Nowosiółki

- Flag Coat of arms

- Location within Poland
- Coordinates: 53°10′33″N 23°31′15″E
- Country: Poland
- Voivodeship: Podlaskie
- County: Białystok
- Gmina: Gródek

Nowosiółki [nɔvɔˈɕuu̯ki] is a village in the administrative district of Gmina Gródek, within Białystok County, Podlaskie Voivodeship, in north-eastern Poland, close to the border with Belarus.
