= Waliły-Dwór =

- Settlement
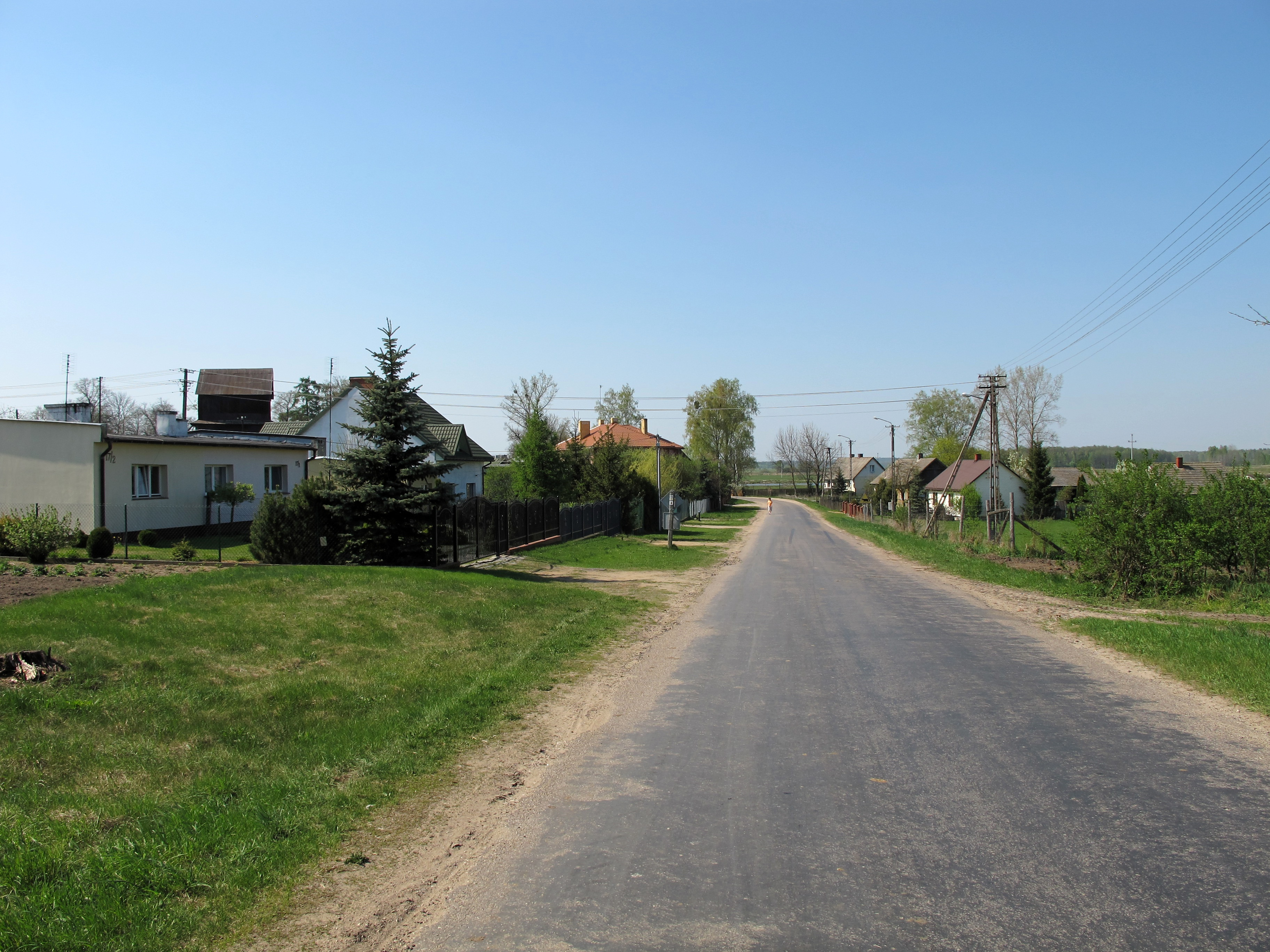

- Location within Poland
- Coordinates: 53°07′40″N 23°36′50″E
- Country: Poland
- Voivodeship: Podlaskie
- County: Białystok
- Gmina: Gródek

Waliły-Dwór [vaˈliwɨ ˈdvur] is a settlement in the administrative district of Gmina Gródek, within Białystok County, Podlaskie Voivodeship, in north-eastern Poland, close to the border with Belarus.
