= Stryjenszczyzna =

- Hamlet
- Location within Poland
- Coordinates: 53°12′7″N 23°27′58″E
- Country: Poland
- Voivodeship: Podlaskie
- County: Białystok
- Gmina: Gródek
- Population: 70

Stryjenszczyzna [strɨjɛnʂˈt͡ʂɨzna] is a hamlet in the administrative district of Gmina Gródek, within Białystok County, Podlaskie Voivodeship, in north-eastern Poland, close to the border with Belarus.
