= Zubry =

- Village
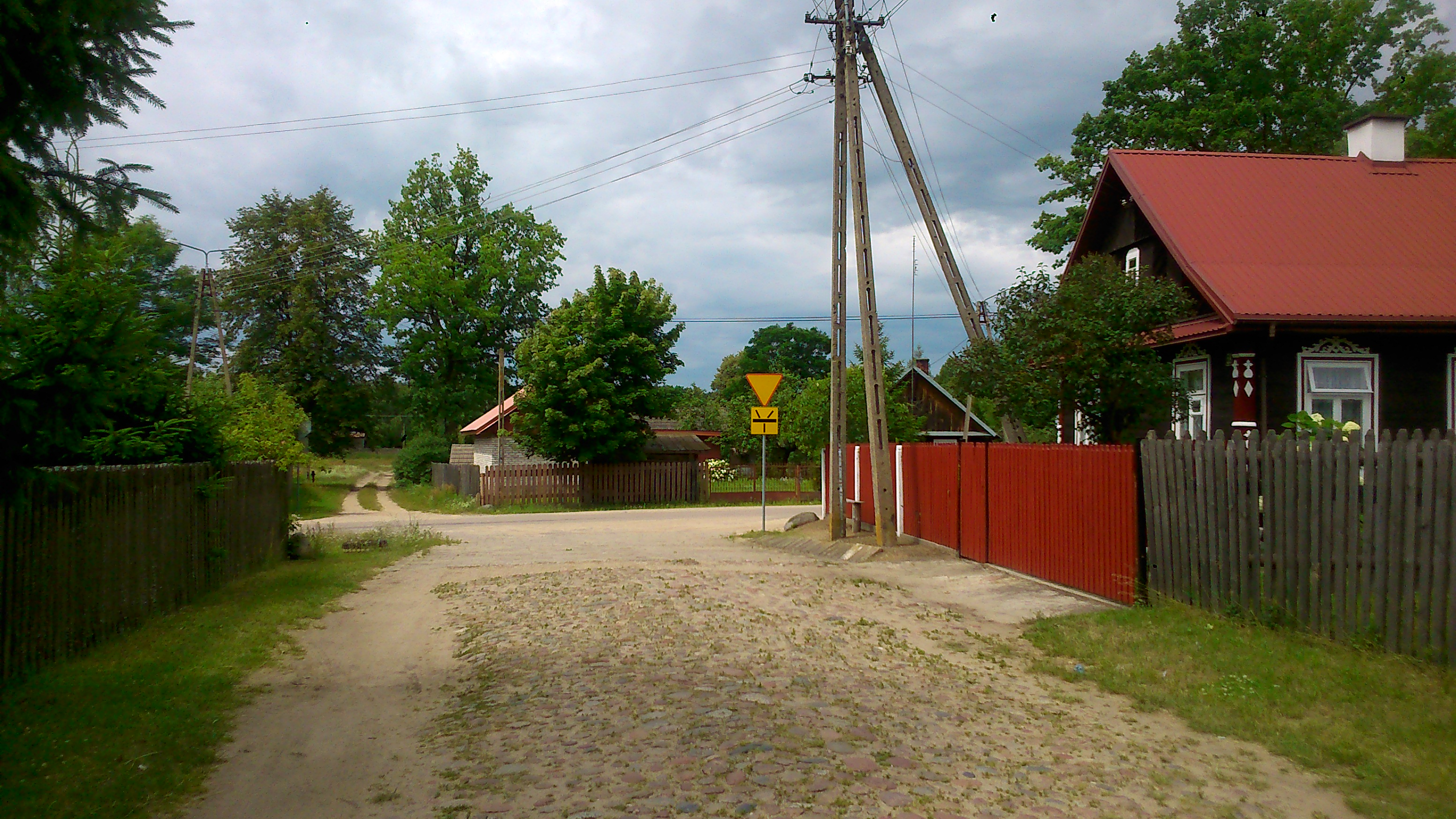

- Location within Poland
- Coordinates: 53°4′5″N 23°48′55″E
- Country: Poland
- Voivodeship: Podlaskie
- County: Białystok
- Gmina: Gródek

Population
  - Total: 190
- Time zone: UTC+1 (CET)
  - Summer (DST): UTC+2 (CEST)
- Vehicle registration: BIA

Zubry [ˈzubrɨ] is a village in the administrative district of Gmina Gródek, within Białystok County, Podlaskie Voivodeship, in north-eastern Poland, close to the border with Belarus.

== History ==
Following the German-Soviet invasion of Poland, which started World War II in September 1939, the village was occupied by the Soviet Union until 1941 and then by Germany until 1944. A battle between the Polish partisans of the Home Army and the German occupiers was fought at Zubry on 10 July 1943.
