= Pałatki =

- Village
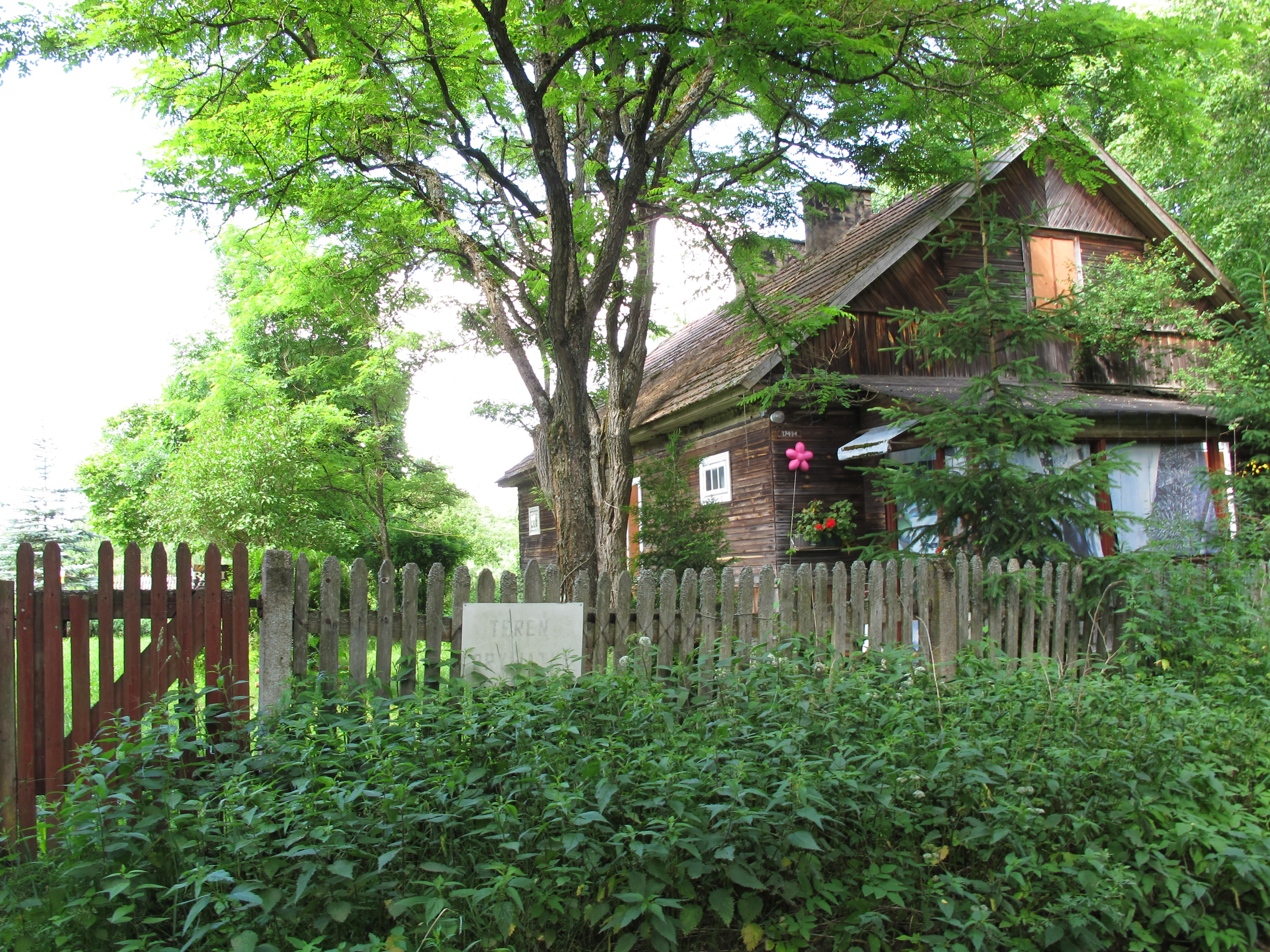

- Location within Poland
- Coordinates: 53°10′17″N 23°26′42″E
- Country: Poland
- Voivodeship: Podlaskie
- County: Białystok
- Gmina: Gródek

Pałatki [paˈwatki] is a village in the administrative district of Gmina Gródek, within Białystok County, Podlaskie Voivodeship, in north-eastern Poland, close to the border with Belarus.
