= Zielona, Gmina Gródek =

Zielona
- Village
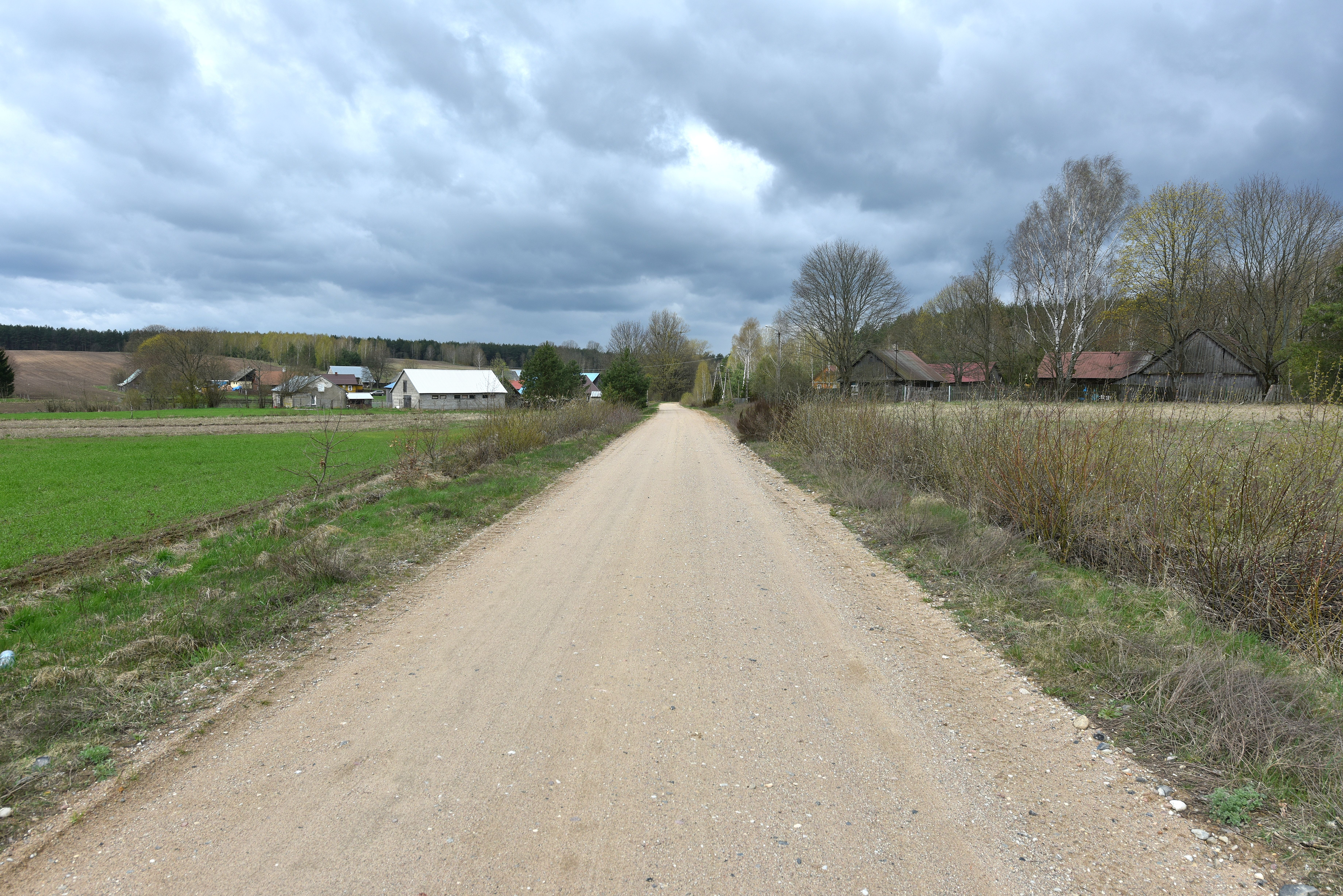
- Zielona, April 2017

- Location within Poland
- Coordinates: 53°3′N 23°50′E
- Country: Poland
- Voivodeship: Podlaskie
- County: Białystok
- Gmina: Gródek

Zielona [ʑɛˈlɔna] is a village in the administrative district of Gmina Gródek, within Białystok County, Podlaskie Voivodeship, in north-eastern Poland, close to the border with Belarus.
