= Gródek-Kolonia, Podlaskie Voivodeship =

Settlement in Gmina Gródek, Poland

Gródek-Kolonia
- Settlement
- Location within Poland
- Coordinates: 53°05′08″N 23°39′54″E
- Country: Poland
- Voivodeship: Podlaskie
- County: Białystok
- Gmina: Gródek

Gródek-Kolonia [ˈɡrudɛk kɔˈlɔɲa] is a settlement in the administrative district of Gmina Gródek, within Białystok County, Podlaskie Voivodeship, in north-eastern Poland, close to the border with Belarus.
