= Piłatowszczyzna =

- Village
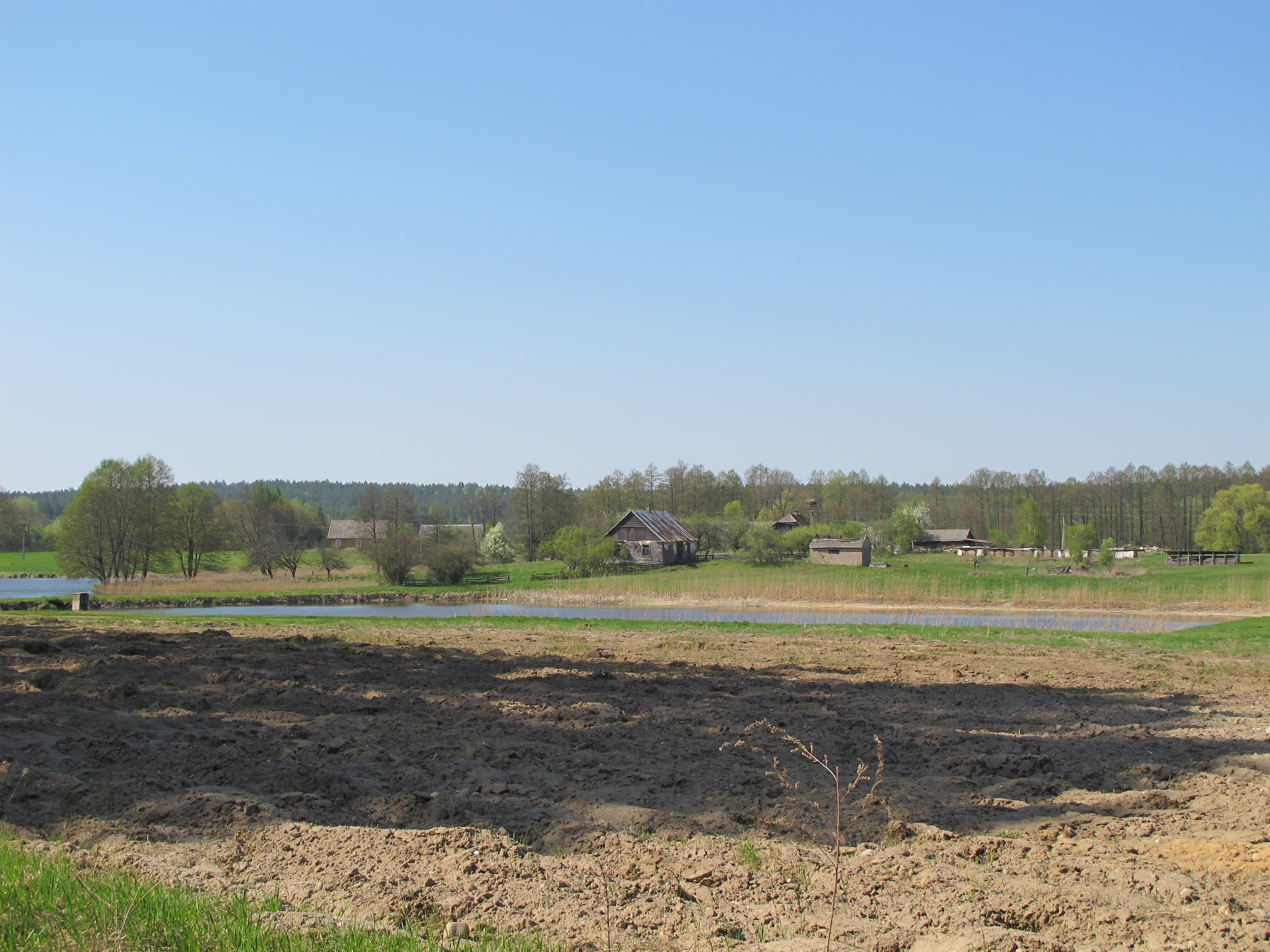

- Location within Poland
- Coordinates: 53°7′N 23°42′E
- Country: Poland
- Voivodeship: Podlaskie
- County: Białystok
- Gmina: Gródek

Piłatowszczyzna [piwatɔfʂˈt͡ʂɨzna] is a village in the administrative district of Gmina Gródek, within Białystok County, Podlaskie Voivodeship, in north-eastern Poland, close to the border with Belarus.
