= Kuberka =

- Settlement
- Location within Poland
- Coordinates: 53°08′04″N 23°28′50″E
- Country: Poland
- Voivodeship: Podlaskie
- County: Białystok
- Gmina: Gródek

Kuberka [kuˈbɛrka] is a settlement in the administrative district of Gmina Gródek, within Białystok County, Podlaskie Voivodeship, in north-eastern Poland, close to the border with Belarus.
