= Przechody, Białystok County =

Przechody
- Village
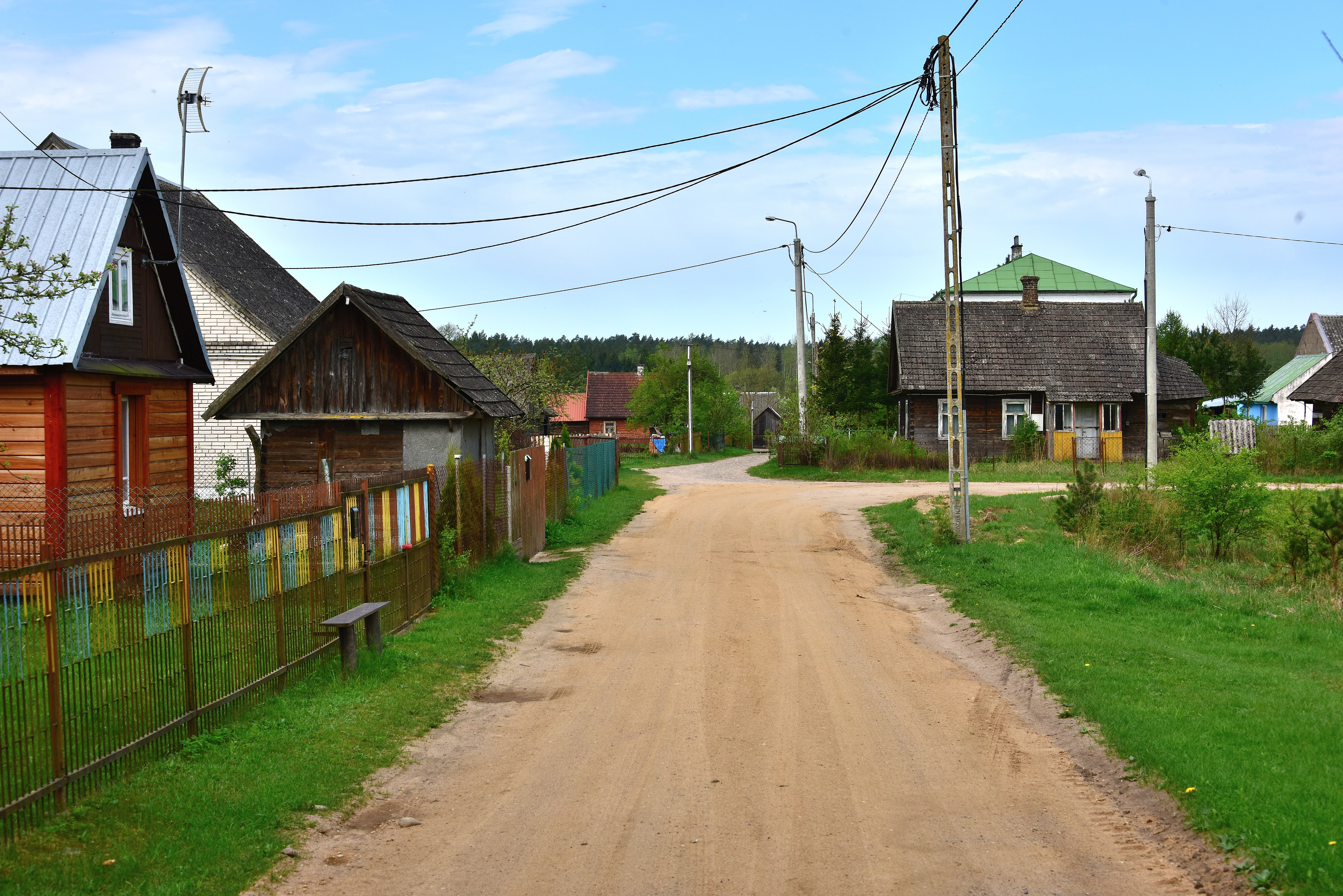

- Location within Poland
- Coordinates: 53°8′N 23°28′E
- Country: Poland
- Voivodeship: Podlaskie
- County: Białystok
- Gmina: Gródek

Przechody [pʂɛˈxɔdɨ] is a village in the administrative district of Gmina Gródek, within Białystok County, Podlaskie Voivodeship, in north-eastern Poland, close to the border with Belarus.

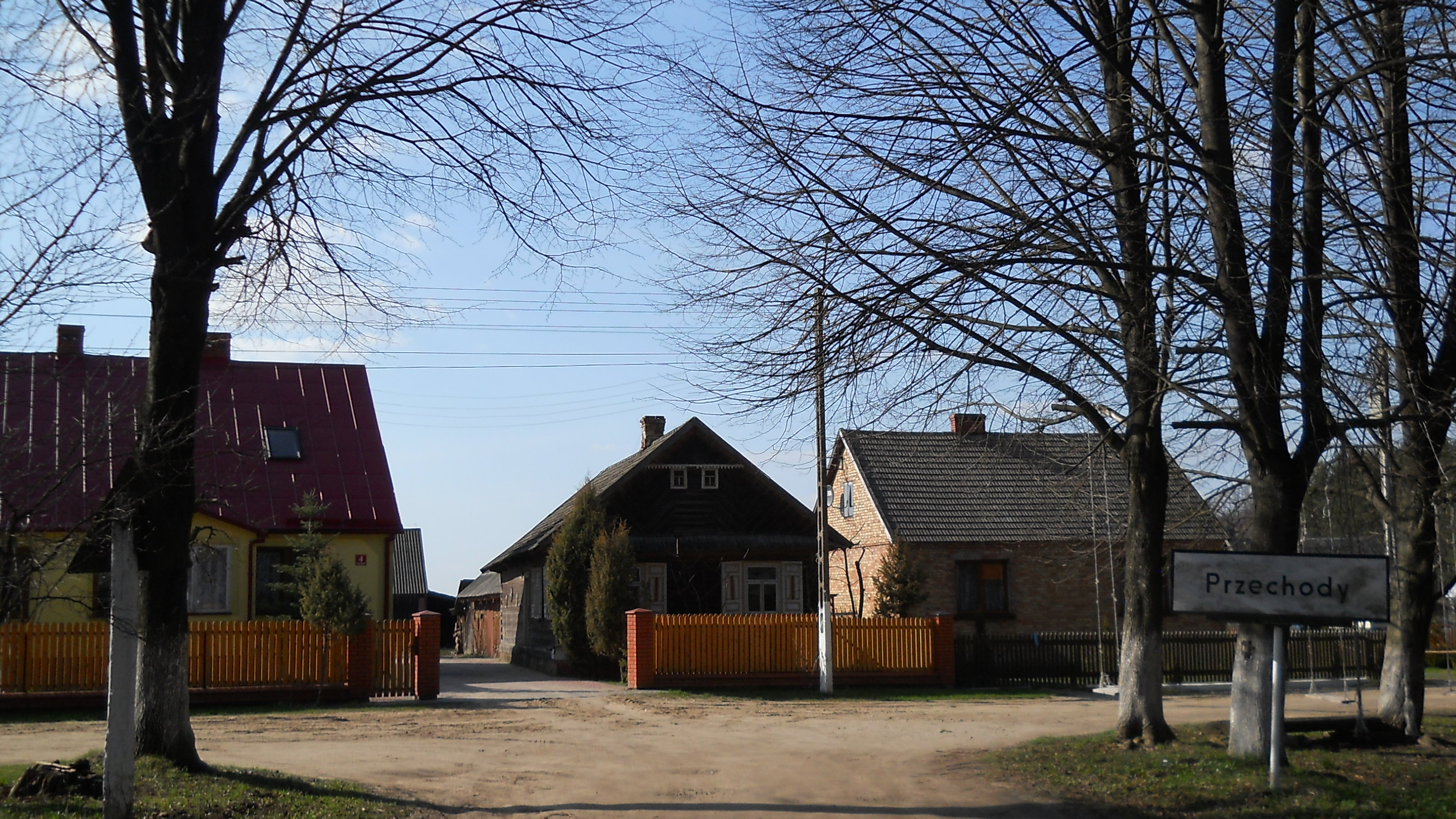
