= Kondycja, Podlaskie Voivodeship =

Kondycja
- Settlement
- Location within Poland
- Coordinates: 53°09′02″N 23°27′04″E
- Country: Poland
- Voivodeship: Podlaskie
- County: Białystok
- Gmina: Gródek

Kondycja [kɔnˈdɨt͡sja] is a settlement in the administrative district of Gmina Gródek, within Białystok County, Podlaskie Voivodeship, in north-eastern Poland, close to the border with Belarus.
