= Gmina Gródek =

Gmina Gródek Gródek Commune
- Gmina
- Coat of arms

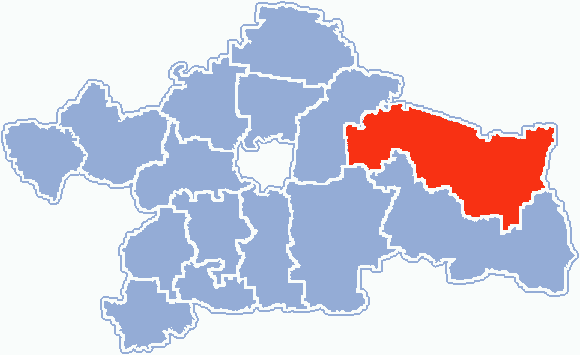
- Location within Białystok County
- Coordinates (Gródek): 53°5′48″N 23°39′24″E
- Country: Poland
- Voivodeship: Podlaskie
- County: Białystok County
- Seat: Gródek

Area
  - Total: 430.6 km^{2} (166.3 sq mi)

Population (2006)
  - Total: 5,740
  - Density: 13.3/km^{2} (34.5/sq mi)
- Website: http://www.grodek.pl/

Gmina Gródek is a rural gmina (administrative district) in Białystok County, Podlaskie Voivodeship, in north-eastern Poland, on the border with Belarus. Its seat is the village of Gródek, which lies approximately 33 kilometres (21 mi) east of the regional capital Białystok.

The gmina covers an area of 430.6 square kilometres (166.3 sq mi), and as of 2006 its total population is 5,740.

The gmina contains part of the protected area called Knyszyń Forest Landscape Park.

== Villages ==
Gmina Gródek contains the villages and settlements of Bagno, Bielewicze, Bobrowniki, Borki, Chomontowce, Downiewo, Dzierniakowo, Glejsk, Gobiaty, Gródek, Gródek-Kolonia, Grzybowce, Jakubin, Jaryłówka, Józefowo, Kołodno, Kondycja, Kozi Las, Królowe Stojło, Królowy Most, Kuberka, Łużany, Mieleszki, Mieleszki-Kolonia, Mostowlany, Narejki, Nowosiółki, Pałatki, Pieszczaniki, Piłatowszczyzna, Podozierany, Podzałuki, Przechody, Radunin, Ruda, Skroblaki, Słuczanka, Sofipol, Straszewo, Stryjenszczyzna, Świsłoczany, Waliły, Waliły-Dwór, Waliły-Stacja, Wiejki, Wierobie, Wyżary, Załuki, Zarzeczany, Zasady, Zielona, Zubki and Zubry.

== Neighbouring gminas ==
Gmina Gródek is bordered by the gminas of Krynki, Michałowo, Supraśl, Szudziałowo and Zabłudów. It also borders Belarus.

== Born ==
- Konstanty Kalinowski (1838–1864) - a writer, journalist, lawyer, one of the leaders of Belarusian and Lithuanian national revival (was born in Mostowlany).
- Aliaksei Karpiuk (1920–1992) - Belarusian writer and public activist (was born in Straszewo).
- Leon Tarasewicz - Polish artist of Belarusian origin (was born in Waliły)

== Culture ==
Basovišča (Music Festival of Young Belarus) – the festival of Belarusian alternative and rock music, which is annually conducted by Belarusian Association of Students since 1990.
