= Downiewo =

- Village
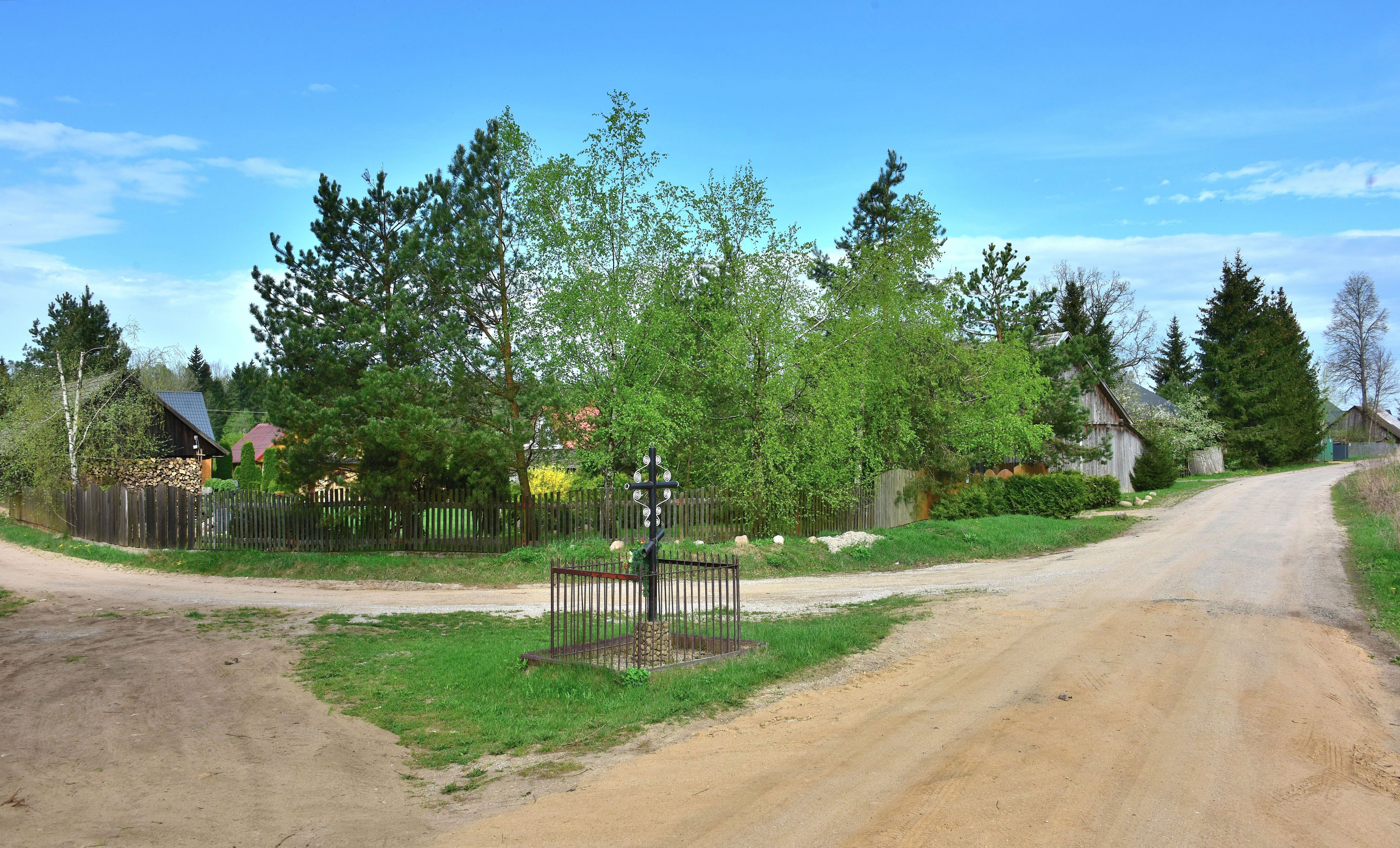

- Location within Poland
- Coordinates: 53°8′N 23°29′E
- Country: Poland
- Voivodeship: Podlaskie
- County: Białystok
- Gmina: Gródek

Downiewo [dɔvˈɲɛvɔ] is a village in the administrative district of Gmina Gródek, within Białystok County, Podlaskie Voivodeship, in north-eastern Poland, close to the border with Belarus.
