= Radunin =

- Village
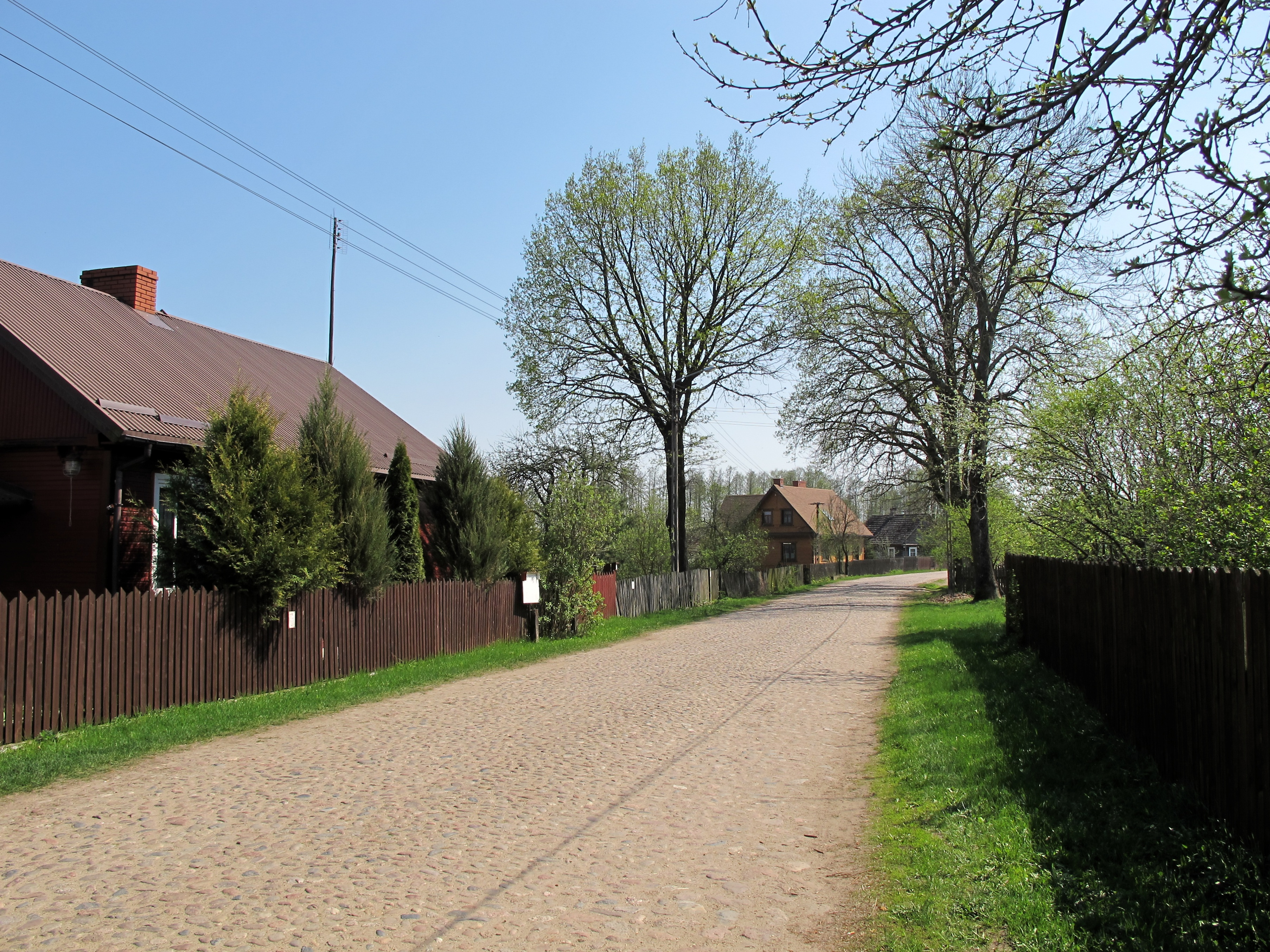

- Location within Poland
- Coordinates: 53°08′30″N 23°28′30″E
- Country: Poland
- Voivodeship: Podlaskie
- County: Białystok
- Gmina: Gródek
- Website: Radunin

Radunin [raˈdunin] is a village in the administrative district of Gmina Gródek, within Białystok County, Podlaskie Voivodeship, in north-eastern Poland, close to the border with Belarus. The village is occupied by a total population of 537 people.
