= Bielewicze =

- Village
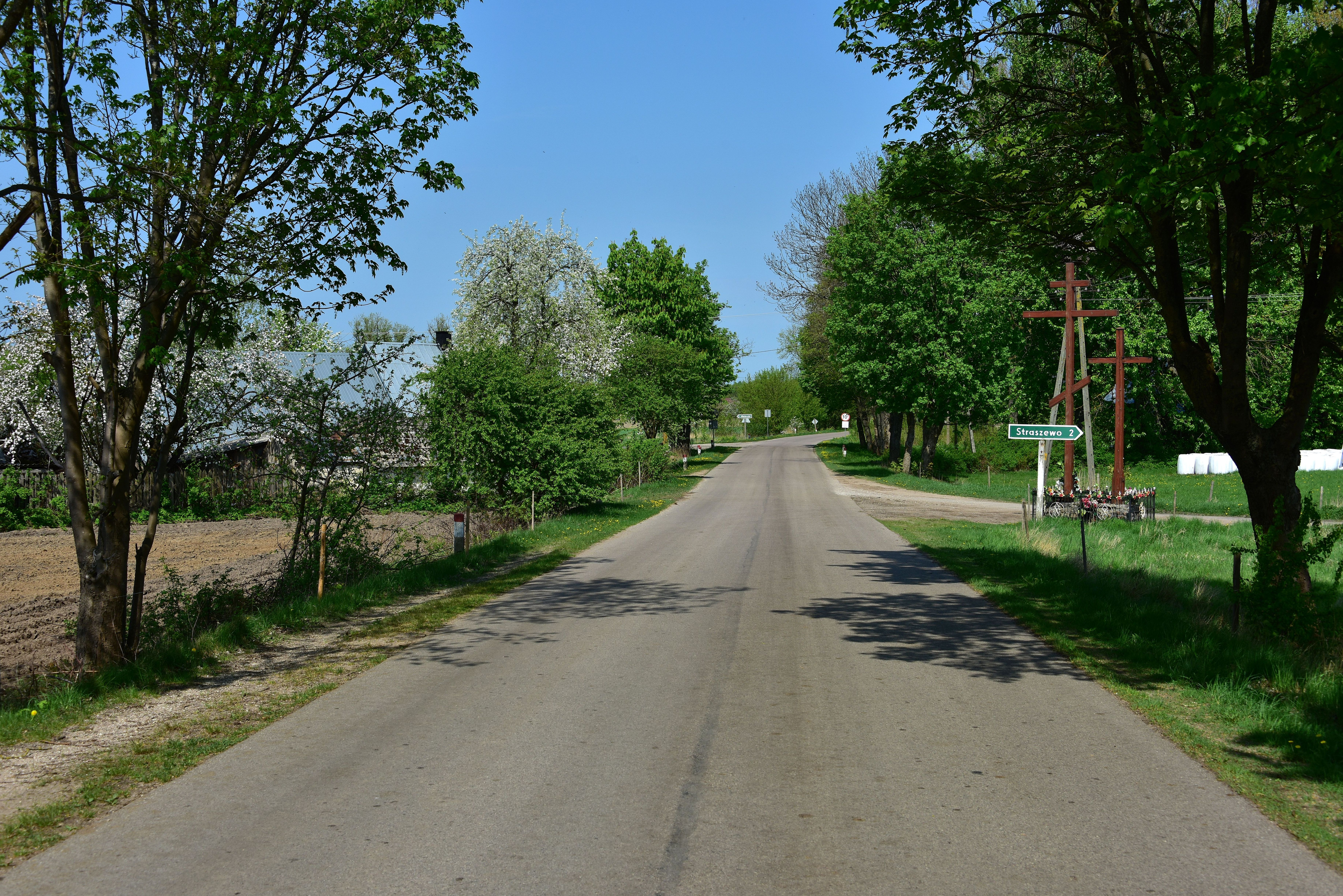

- Location within Poland
- Coordinates: 53°5′N 23°42′E
- Country: Poland
- Voivodeship: Podlaskie
- County: Białystok
- Gmina: Gródek

Bielewicze [bjɛlɛˈvit͡ʂɛ] is a village in the administrative district of Gmina Gródek, within Białystok County, Podlaskie Voivodeship, in north-eastern Poland, close to the border with Belarus.

== Climate ==
The climate is temperate, with mild winters and warm summers. The average temperature in January is -1 °C–-5 °C, and in July +17 °C–+19 °C.[6] Precipitation is 500–800 mm.
