= Waliły-Stacja =

- Village
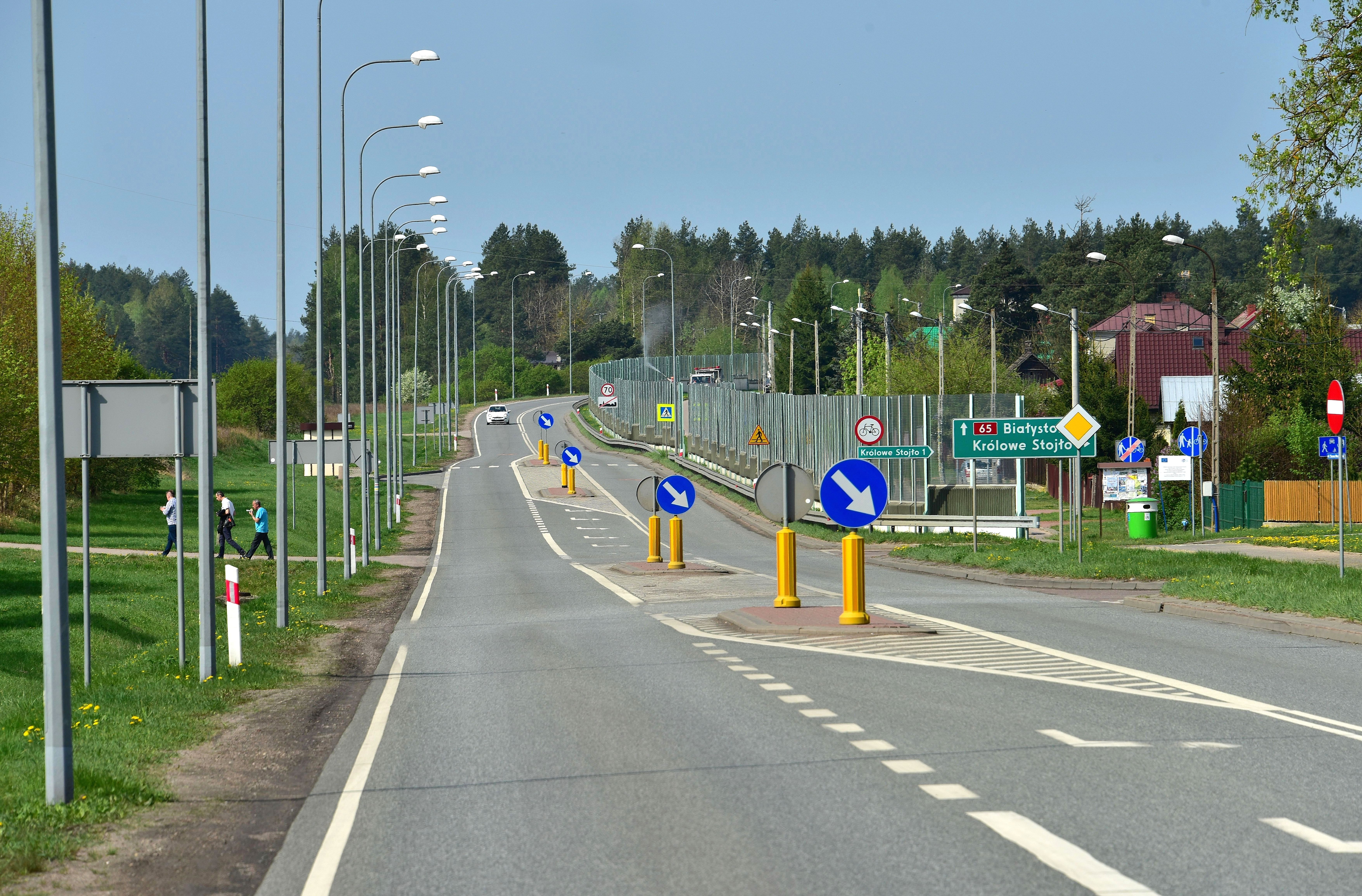
- Ul. Szosa Wschodnia - National Road no. 65, crossing the village

- Location within Poland
- Coordinates: 53°6′N 23°39′E
- Country: Poland
- Voivodeship: Podlaskie
- County: Białystok
- Gmina: Gródek
- Population: 680

Waliły-Stacja [vaˈliwɨ ˈstat͡sja] is a village in the administrative district of Gmina Gródek, within Białystok County, Podlaskie Voivodeship, in north-eastern Poland, close to the border with Belarus.
