= Załuki, Podlaskie Voivodeship =

Załuki
- Village
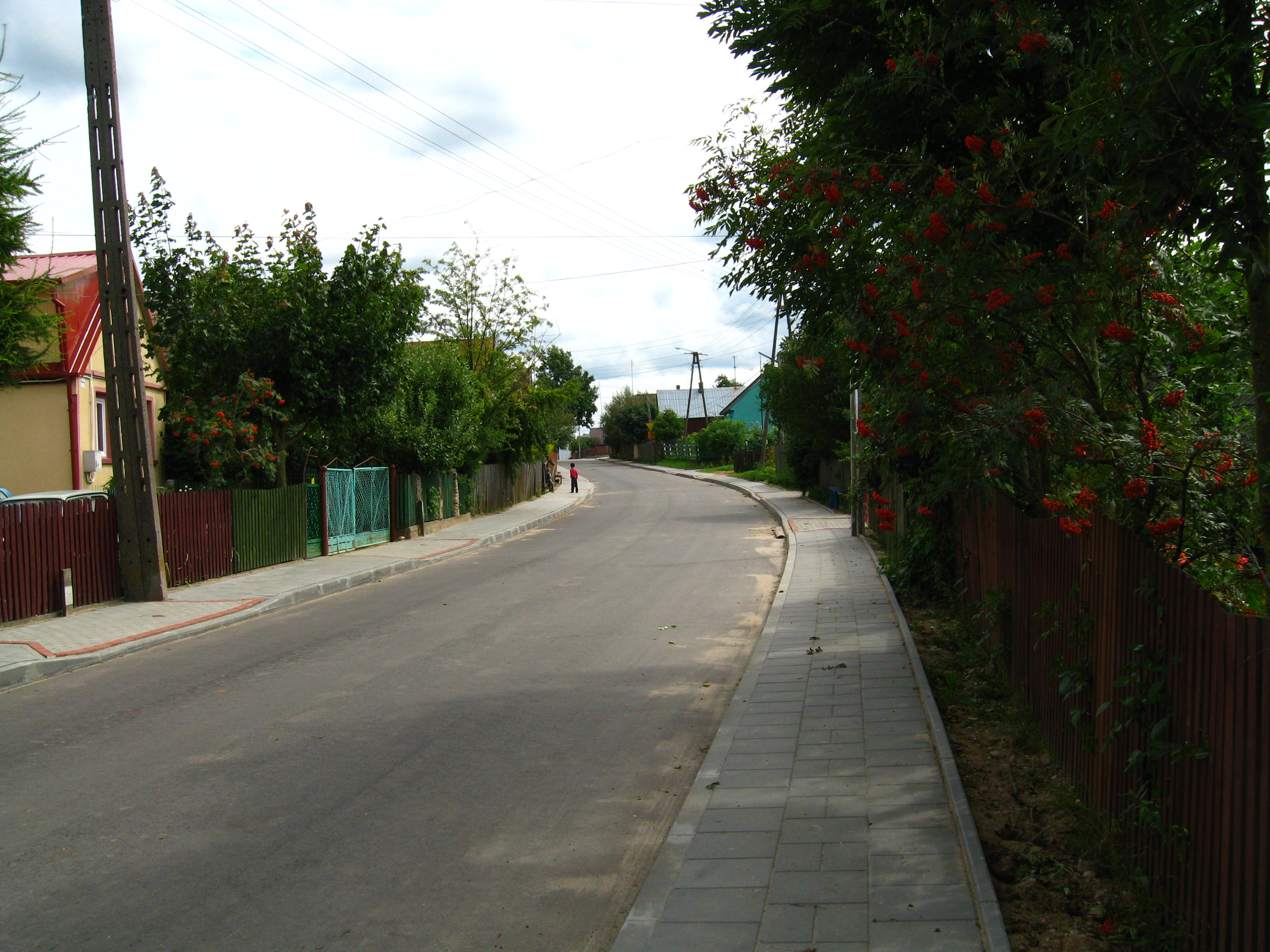

- Location within Poland
- Coordinates: 53°10′N 23°33′E
- Country: Poland
- Voivodeship: Podlaskie
- County: Białystok
- Gmina: Gródek
- Population: 210

Załuki [zaˈwuki] is a village in the administrative district of Gmina Gródek, within Białystok County, Podlaskie Voivodeship, in north-eastern Poland, close to the border with Belarus.

The village has a population of 247 (data from the 2021 National Population and Housing Census), earlier in 2006 it had a population of 217 (data from the USC in Grodek from December 29, 2006). It is located in the Knyszynska Forest Landscape Park, on the Supraśl River.
