= Belarus–Poland border =

International border

Coordinates: 51°30′28″N 23°37′4″E

Belarusian–Polish border
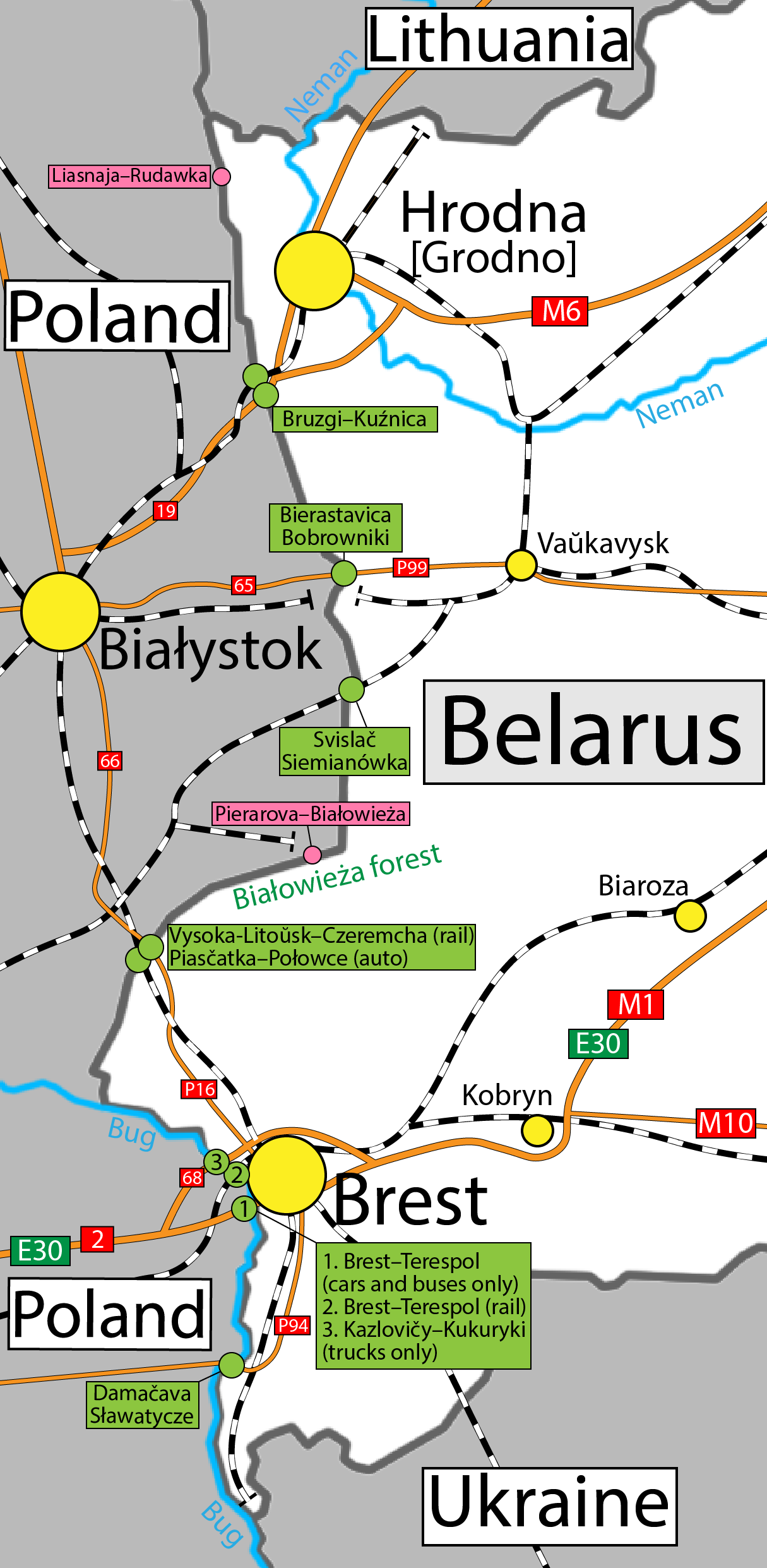
- Border crossings Simplified crossing points

Characteristics
- Entities: Belarus Poland
- Length: 398.6 km (248 mi), 418 km (260 mi) or 416 km (258 mi)

History
- Established: December 1991; Dissolution of the Soviet Union
- Current shape: 2011; Treaty

Belarusian and Polish boundary markers

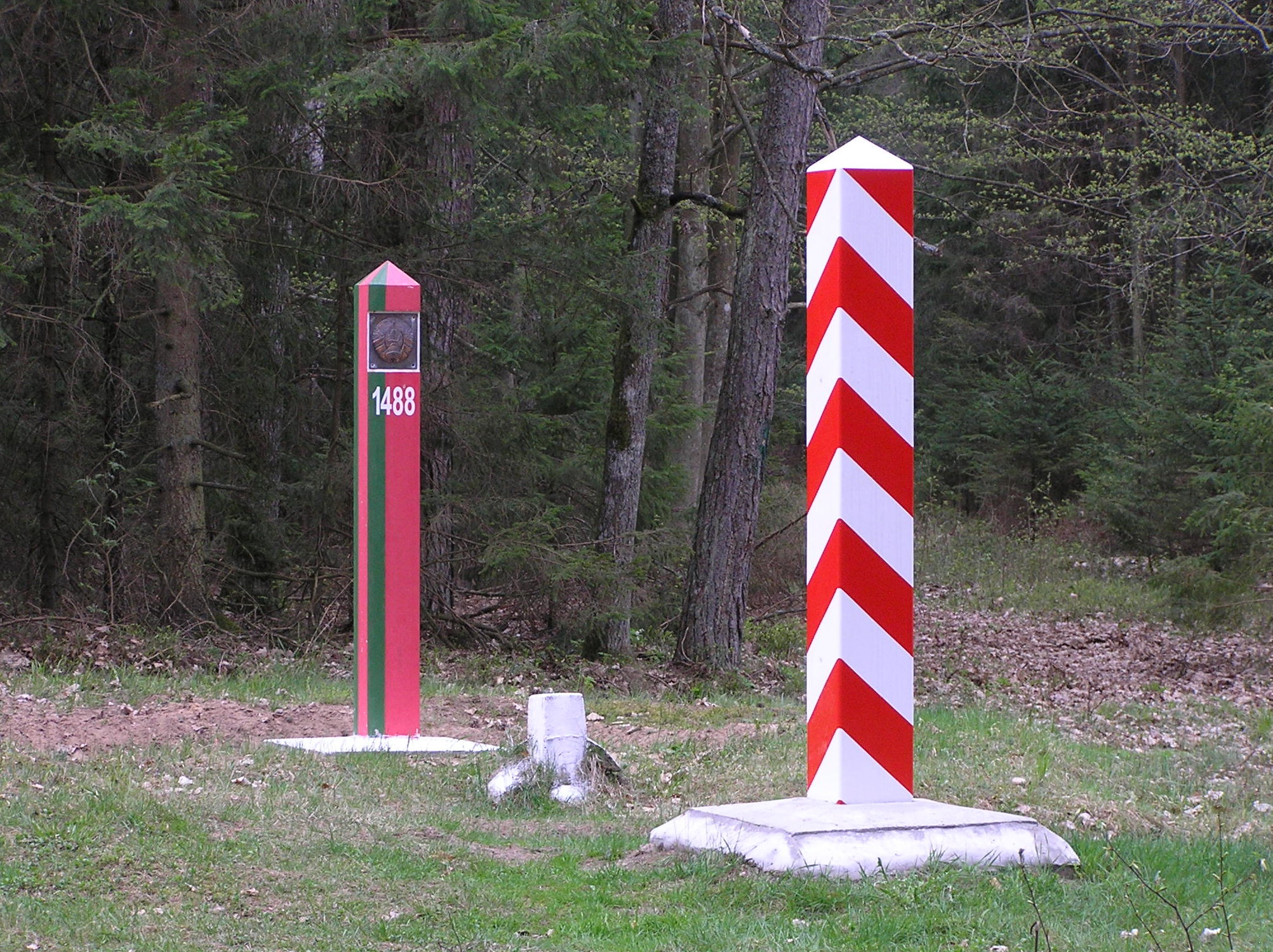
Border crossing in Białowieża Forest in 2008.

Borders of Poland, with the Polish-Belarusian border marked in orange

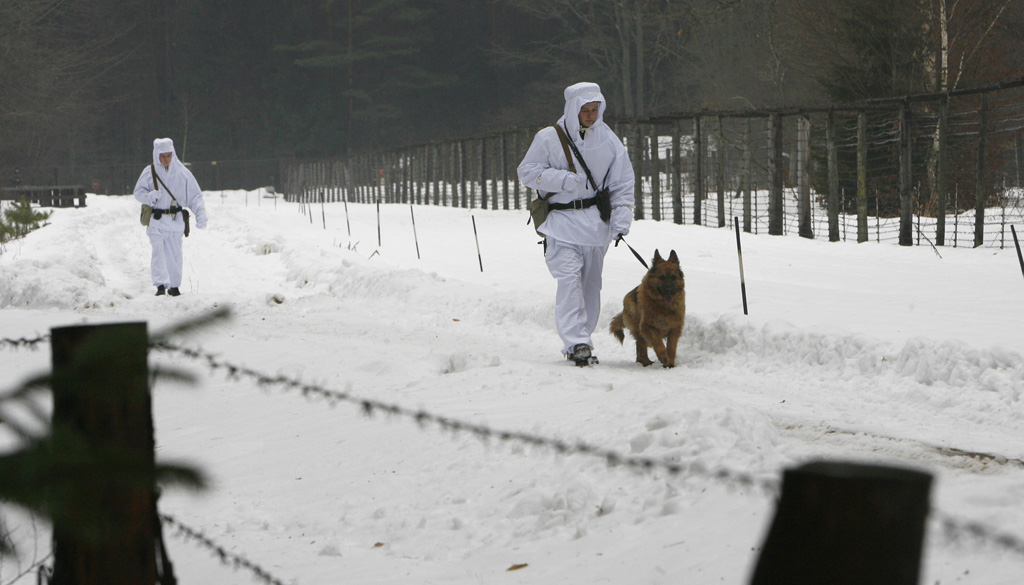
Belarusian Border Guards patrolling the border fence with working dog.

The Belarusian–Polish border is the state border between the Republic of Poland (EU member) and the Republic of Belarus (Union State). It has a total length of 398.6 km (247.7 mi), 418 km (260 mi) or 416 km (258 mi) (sources vary). It starts from the triple junction of the borders with Lithuania in the north and stretches to a triple junction border with Ukraine in the south. It is also part of the EU border with Belarus. The border runs along the administrative borders of two Voivodships Podlaskie and Lubelskie in the Polish side and Grodno and Brest Vobłasć in the Belarusian side. In the Polish side, the 246.93 km (153.44 mi) section is under the protection of the Podlaski Border Guard Regional Unit, while the 171.31 km (106.45 mi) section is in the operation area of the Bug Border Guard Regional Unit. Border rivers (from north to south) are Czarna Hańcza, Wołkuszanka, Świsłocz, Narew, and Bug.

== History ==
After the Soviet invasion of Poland at the start of World War II in September 1939, the bulk of the northern half of eastern Poland (excluding Wilno), was annexed into the Byelorussian Soviet Socialist Republic as so-called Western Belorussia. Five new Voblasts were created: Baranavichy, Belostok, Brest, Pinsk, and Vilyeyka.

=== Post-war agreements ===
In accordance with the Border Agreement between Poland and the USSR of 16 August 1945, 17 districts of Belastok Voblast of the BSSR including the city of Białystok and 3 districts of Brest Voblast were restored to Poland.

Following the 1944 agreement on population exchange between Poland and Soviet Belarus, on 25 November 1945, an additional agreement was signed in Warsaw by representatives of the government of the Byelorussian Soviet Socialist Republic and the Government of the National Unity of the Republic of Poland on the registration and evacuation of the Belarusian population from the territory of Poland to the BSSR and Polish population from the BSSR to the territory of Poland. Announcements on registration and extension of the evacuation until June 1946 were posted in Białystok and within the Białystok Voivodeship.

On 12 August 1944, the Polish delegation met for the first time with their Soviet counterparts, led by Markow – an opponent of any compromises. The Soviets brought a map in the scale of 1:1,500,000 to the meeting, along with a detailed border agreement, both documents bore the signature of Osóbka-Morawski on 25 July 1944. The delimitation continued on 13 August. The Polish and Soviet delegations resolved the disputed issues regarding the scale of the maps and agreed a position on the manner of negotiating the points of contention presented by the Polish government. The agreement between the PKWN and the BSSR on the evacuation of Polish citizens from the territory of Belarus and the Belarusian population from the territory of Poland, concluded in September 1944, intensified the mixing of various ethnic groups in north-eastern Poland; and yet the war had already caused mass migrations of peoples throughout Europe. People often had to make immediate decisions about staying in their native villages, which were suddenly to be in another country or deciding to repatriate, when only very few Poles knew where the recently formed eastern border of the Białystok Voivodeship is. More than once it happened that the border has divided not only a village in half, but even the farm, so that the house is on the Polish side of the border and the barn on the Soviet (Belarusian) side. During the negotiations, Poland obtained favourable changes in shifting the border of the Białystok Voivodeship to the east to only 8 kilometers or less. Practically, diplomatic talks regarding the eastern border of the region ended on that day. The original intention of the border negotiations after 16 August 1945 was the exchange of territories between Poland and the USSR on the basis of complete equilibrium. However, as a result of negotiations along the entire eastern border, nine shifts of the border were made by 7 and 1/2 kilometres or less in favor of Poland, land was acquired with a total area of 799 square kilometres. The USSR obtained 11 shifts of 7 kilometers or less in its favor and acquired land with a total area of 565 square kilometres. Poland also undertook to transfer 234 square kilometres of land in East Prussia to the USSR as compensation for 'unequal' exchange on the eastern border.

In neighboring Sokółka County, the situation was the same. In the Sokółka County, the border line was moved eastward in favor of Poland from 100 to 3,000 meters. Starting from the north, in the Sokółka County of the Nowy Dwor commune, the village of Rogacze partially returned to Poland. Most of the land remained on the USSR side. Moving further south, the border crossed the Suwałki-Grodno line east of the Bielany railway station. Between the track and the road, a large village of Chworościany, with 50 farms and land with medium-quality soil, returned to the Polish side. South of Chworościany, the border moved east by about 1,200 meters. No villages returned to Poland. In the Kuźnica commune, the border line was moved 200–300 m to the east, crossing the Białystok-Grodno railway line, running north-east of the town of Kuźnica and here crossing the Białystok-Grodno road. In the Kuźnica commune, the village of Nowodziel was handed back to Poland, but its land remained on the side of the USSR. In the Nowodziel region, the border was moved approximately 700–800 meters to the east, which allowed the villages to gain: Tokze with 20 farms, Szymaki with 20-25 farms and Klimówka with 25 farms. Moving south, the border reached the commune of Babiki, where the border line was moved 1,700 m to the east in relation to the old one, which resulted in the village of Palestyna, inhabited before the war mostly by Jewish people who were engaged in agriculture, becoming part again of Poland. Volniki – 75 farms – were within Poland's borders. Near Norniki, the border was moved by 1,200 m. Near Odelsk, Poland gained only lands, because Odelsk itself remained within the borders of the USSR. The arable lands of Zubrzyca Mała and Zubrzyca Wielka were also recovered. To the east of Zubrzyca Mała, the village of Minkowce, with 80 farms, returned to Poland. As a result of the border shifting by 2,000 m to the east, Usnarz Górny, the land of which, however, remained in the USSR, Grzybowszczyzna, and Jurowlany, passed back to Poland. Near Krynki, the border crossed the Krynki-Brzostowica road and was moved 1 km to the east, which meant that the Polish side only gained in terms of terrain, as there were no towns there. The village of Łapicze was cut in half by the border line. In the Sokółka County, the border line incorporated 15 villages into Poland, the vast majority of them Polish, with a favourable attitude towards the Polish authorities. All in all, the county obtained a shift of the border from 200 to 3,000 meters to the east, most of the returned villages were ethnically Polish: Rogacze, Chworościany, Nowdziel, Szymaki, Nomiki, Minkowce, Łapicze, Gobiaty, Usnarz Górny, Jurowlany and Rudaki. The county also acquired the devastated and abandoned areas of the former Jewish settlement of Palestyna, and the village of Grzybowszczyzna inhabited by Belarusians. In the Gmina Kuźnica, the border line was moved 200–300 metres (about a furlong) to the east and at this place the border was cut across the tracks of the Białystok-Grodno railway line.

Bialystok County territorially benefited from the delimitation carried out by the sixth Subcommittee. First of all, in three locations, near Zaleszany, Bobrowniki and Ozierany, the county obtained a strip with a width of 2 to 5 kilometers. However, this county was characterized by a much more diverse ethnic mosaic than the almost purely ethnic Polish Augustów County or the somewhat ethnically mixed Sokółka County. While Zaleszany was inhabited by the Polish population, Bobrowniki, Chomontowce, Wielkie Oziery and Małe Oziery were 70 to 90% Belarusian.

The proposals regarding delimitation of the border presented by the District National Councils from Suwałki, Białystok, Sokołka, Augustów and Bielsk Podlaski were sent by the voivode of Białystok, Stefan Dybowski, to the Minister of Public Administration in Warsaw. The voivode stated that the proposals he submitted met the needs of the people living there and also protected the interests of the Białystok Voivodeship and Poland. He asked the minister to resolve them positively. In 1946, during the refinement of the state border between the USSR and Poland in the Belarusian-Polish section, Krynki, which was entirely granted to Poland, had a point that separated the border section under Sub-Committee V from the activities of Sub-Committee VI. On 6 November 1946, work on the delimitation of the border between Poland and the USSR was completed. Further, the border ran through areas which Poland lost due to the Soviet dictate, because they were located on the west side of the Curzon Line. This shift was around 12 km (7 miles) in the vicinity of Odelsk, 15 km (10 miles) in the Łosośny area, 20 km (12 miles) in Biała Blota, and 15 km (10 miles) in the area of the Augustów Canal. Polish negotiators during the delimitation procedure realized that they were helpless in the face of these imposed arrangements and were only trying to introduce minor verifications for Poland. Among other things, near Odelsk, within the borders of Poland were the villages of Klimówka, Minkowce, Nomiki, Taki, Tołcze, Szymaki of the Hrodna District and the villages of Todorkowce and Chworosciany of the Sapotskin district were transferred to the Polish People's Republic. Zubrzyca Wielka and Zubrzyca Mała were also recovered, but most of the agricultural lands belonging to these villages remained on Belarusian side of the border.

In Bielsk County, the following villages were completely or partially transferred to the USSR: Wolka Purzyca was completely transferred to the USSR. 17 Polish families abandoned their homes and moved to the forest on the Polish side, from where they were transported to farms in the Bielsko County. Tokary – the village was cut by a border. 60% of its area was transferred to the USSR, including 17 completely built-up colonies with high agricultural culture, inhabited by Polish people. The Klukowicze-Kolonia left to the USSR. The village of Wyczulki remained on the Polish side, but 30% of the arable land went to the USSR, Lumianka left to the USSR, Bobrówka remained in Poland, but 2/3 of its lands was on the Soviet side. The village of Hola went to the USSR, and 40 hectares of bush remained in Poland. Pieszczatka – the settlements went to the USSR and the land was divided 50%. Chlewiszcze, the village went to the USSR, Terechy went to the USSR, and 35 ha of land remained on the Polish side, Alwus (Belarusian: Альвус) given entirely to the USSR, on the Polish side, 70 ha of pastures remained in Poland, Opaka Mała – the settlements went to the USSR with 312 ha of agricultural land remained on the Polish side, Opaka Wielka went entirely to the USSR, Kazimierowo went entirely to the USSR. Bobinka – the village, apart from three colonies, completely belonged to the USSR. In Białowieża Forest, Dołbizna – the entire village went to the USSR while the village Białowieża itself remained on the Polish side. In Białystok County, the border was moved around three towns. The following people came to Poland: Zaleszany which was the richest village within the Gmina Michałowo had compact, very fertile soil. The average size of individual farms was 10 ha. Inhabited by 500 families. The arable land remained on the Soviet side. Bobrowniki which was a village located on both sides of the Białystok – Wołkowysk road, with over 500 farms, Rudaki which was a poor village, hilly terrain, sandy soil, Chomontowce, Wielkie and Małe Oziery – villages with 100 farms each, low-quality soil and sandy, hilly terrain.

Polish local authorities requested the resettlement of the Belarusian population from the villages of Jurowalny, Grzybowszczyzna, Usnarz Gorny and Łapicze to the territory of the BSSR. In their place, it was planned to settle the Polish population from the areas that were leaving to the USSR. The Kurzyniec lock on the Augustów Canal marked the northern border point of the Augustów County and separated the Suwałki County from the Augustów County. The border passed through the Augustów Canal and bisected the crown of the Kurzyniec Lock. The settlements and arable land adjacent to the village of Rudawka remained within Poland. Further south, the border ran through forested areas and deviated from the previous one by 2,000 meters to the east. In the Augustów County, the following came to Poland: Settlement Sołojewszczyzna – 10 farms, Wolkusz which had 30 farms, Bohatery Leśne – 70 farms, Lichosielce – 15 farms, half of the village Rakowicze was assigned to Poland (about 80 farms), in Lipszczany only 5 farms passed from the village to Polish side. Due to the straightening of the border in Augustów County, Poland gained several villages. Clearing villages and housing estates happened in Rakowicze and Lipszczany.

Another modification of the border came into force by a treaty signed on 15 May 1948. Kowale, Nowodziel and Łosiniany returned as well according to the treaty.

In August 1948, the TASS agency announced a communication on the completion of delimitation of the border. However, the local authorities determined the final shape of the border and belonging of individual villages or their fragments for more than a year and a half. On the basis of documentation of the Belarusian side, officially announced on 8 July 1950, the Polish side obtained 30 villages as part of exchange and border corrections, while the Belarusian side obtained 12 villages. Also, many villages had been divided.

Pursuant to art. 2 of the Agreement between the Republic of Poland and the Soviet Union on the Polish-Soviet state border and documents signed by the Mixed Commission of Poland and the USSR of 30 April 1947, the state border between Poland and the USSR in the Białystok Voivodeship ran as follows: straight lines with a small section of the river Leśna and Przekłaka (Perewołoki) in a general north-eastern direction from a point on the Bug River 1/2 kilometer above Niemirów to a point 4 kilometers east of Białowieża, over a distance of approximately 76 kilometers (border posts from numbers 1346 to 1495), leaving on the Polish side towns: Niemirów, Klukowicze, Wyczółki, Bobrówka, Stawiszcze and Wólka Terechowska, Opaka Wielka, Biała Straż, Wojnówka and Górny Gród. The following towns remained on the Soviet side: Wólka Pużycka, Tołszcze, Łumno, Łumianka, Hola, Piszczatka, Chlewiszcze, Terechy, Opaka Mała, Wołkostawiec, Bobinka, Klatkowo, Grabowiec and the settlements of Tokary, Turowszczyzna and the Chlewiszcze colony were divided between Poland and the Soviet Union. The border then ran in straight lines and a small section of the Narew River, from a point 4 kilometers east of Białowieża to a point on the Istoczanka River near the town of Dziegiele, over a distance of approximately 36 kilometers (border posts no. 1495 to 1563), of which 1 kilometer along the Narew River (from boundary marker no. 1533 to no. 1535). On the Polish side, the following settlements remained: Białowieża, Stare Masiewo, Babia Góra, Brzezina, Zaleszany, Jałówka and Kondratki, while on the Soviet side there were the villages of Gnilica, Czoło and Jałówka and the town of Wroni Bór and Niezbodzicze. The border crossed Zaleszany. Then the border ran through the Istoczana, Jałówka and Świsłocz rivers from a point on Istoczanka near the town of Dziegiele to a point on Świsłocza 1/2 kilometer east of the town of Ozierany Małe, over a distance of approximately 38 kilometers, border posts no. 1563 to 1617. Dublany remained in Poland, Mostowalny, Świsłoczany, Gobiaty, Bobrowniki, Chomentowce, Rudaki, Łosiniany and Ozierany. The USSR took over Łukowicze, Bursowszczyzna, Rudawa, Rudowalny, Hołynka (Belarusian: Галынка) and Nieporozniowce. Then the border ran in straight lines and a small section of the Wołkuszanka and Czarna Hańcza rivers in a north-eastern direction, from a point on the Świsłocza River 1/2 east of Ozierany Małe to a point on the Marysze River 2 kilometers below the village. The site covered an area of approximately 90.5 kilometer (border posts no. 1617 to 1789). On the Polish side remained Jamasze, Łapicze, Krynki, Jurowalny, Grzybowszczyna, Usnarz Górny, Minkowce, Zubryca, Nowiki, Klimókwa, Szymaki, Tokze, Nowodziel, Kuźnica, Saczkowce, Wołyńce, Chworościany, Lipszczany, Rakowicze, Lichosielce, Bartniki, Bohatery Leśne, Sołojewszczyzna and Rudawka. The USSR took over: Porzecze, Służki, Ostapkowszczyzna, Rzepowicze, Usnarz Dolny, Odelsk with the Issac Colony, Czarnowszczyzna Podlipki, Łosośna, Dubnica, Bielany, Rogacze, Nowo-siółki, Bohatery Polne, Komiasarowo, Hołynka, Markowce, Darguń, Wołkuszek, Kurzyniec and Eśniczówka Giedz.

Thereafter, and until now, the border between Poland and Belarus has never changed.

=== Impact of the new border ===
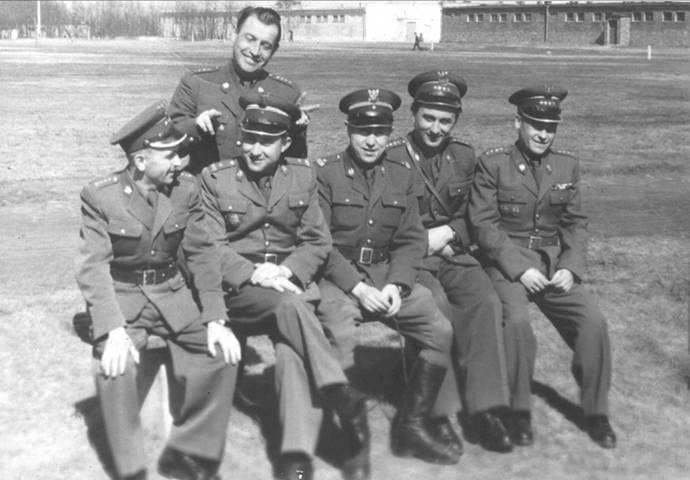
Polish Border Protection Troops in Włodawa in the 1950s

The impact of the new border demarcation had a negative influence on the infrastructure and economic activity in the Polish side of the border (Bialystok Voivodeship). This border has cut off or seriously complicated a large part of the rail, road and telecommunications networks. Mainly, but not only, in the counties of Augustów and Sokołka, the border ran against economic logic. Thus, the Białystok-Augustów-Suwałki railway line would remain entirely within the territory of Poland if the Polish-Soviet Mixed Commission for Border Delimitation had drawn the border line as stipulated in the Yalta Agreement. For example, if Kiełbasy (Belarusian: Келбаскі) which became part of the BSSR would have been stayed in Poland, this would significantly accelerate the post-war reconstruction from the damage because the Polish State Railways did not resume traffic on the alternative route to Suwałki and Augustów, leading through the cities of Ełk and Olecko until 24 November 1946. Alternatively, in order to avoid the economically absurd Białystok-Ełk-Olecko-Suwałki-Augustów railway connection, PKP had to build a new railway line (no. 40) from Sokółka to Dąbrowa Białostocka . The new border also cut off various road connections, such as the main paved road from Nowy Dwór to Sejny. This road, remaining in Poland, would significantly facilitate transport between the north-eastern part of the Sokólka County and the south-eastern part of the Augustów County. The location of the new border significantly delayed the reconstruction of these areas, considering the fact that they were heavily forested and that the main road from Augustów to Sejny remained severely damaged and mined until June 1946. telephone and telegraph connections were of great importance. Again, the new frontier severed or significantly complicated the telephone and telegraph connections that had survived the six years of Soviet and German occupation. The telecommunication system suffered as well in May 1946 it was reported that telephone calls between Białystok and Augustów were connected through the exchanges in Grajewo and Suwałki, which meant delays in connections from two to four hours. And just as PKP was forced to build a new section of the railway route, the Ministry of Posts and Telegraphs had to build a new telephone line between Białystok and Augustów solely because of the new border. Communication disruptions manifested themselves in many ways, often communes which formally belonged to one of the pre-war counties annexed by the USSR had no direct connections with the main centers of the new counties. For example, Krynki and Suchowola could connect with Sokółka only through Białystok. The new border with the Soviet Union caused an increase in hidden costs in the case of communication, due to the effective failure or inaccessibility of the means of transport and communications: for example, following the demarcation of the border, the road from Sidra to Strzelczyki (following the demarcation it is part of the BSSR) now ended six kilometers from the border in Staworowo, as there is no border crossing to the Soviet Union there. The railway line from Dąbrowa Białostocka to Grodno (the latter became part of the BSSR) had been cancelled. The situation had contributed to the delay in the reconstruction of the voivodeship from the war damage.

=== 2021 border crisis ===
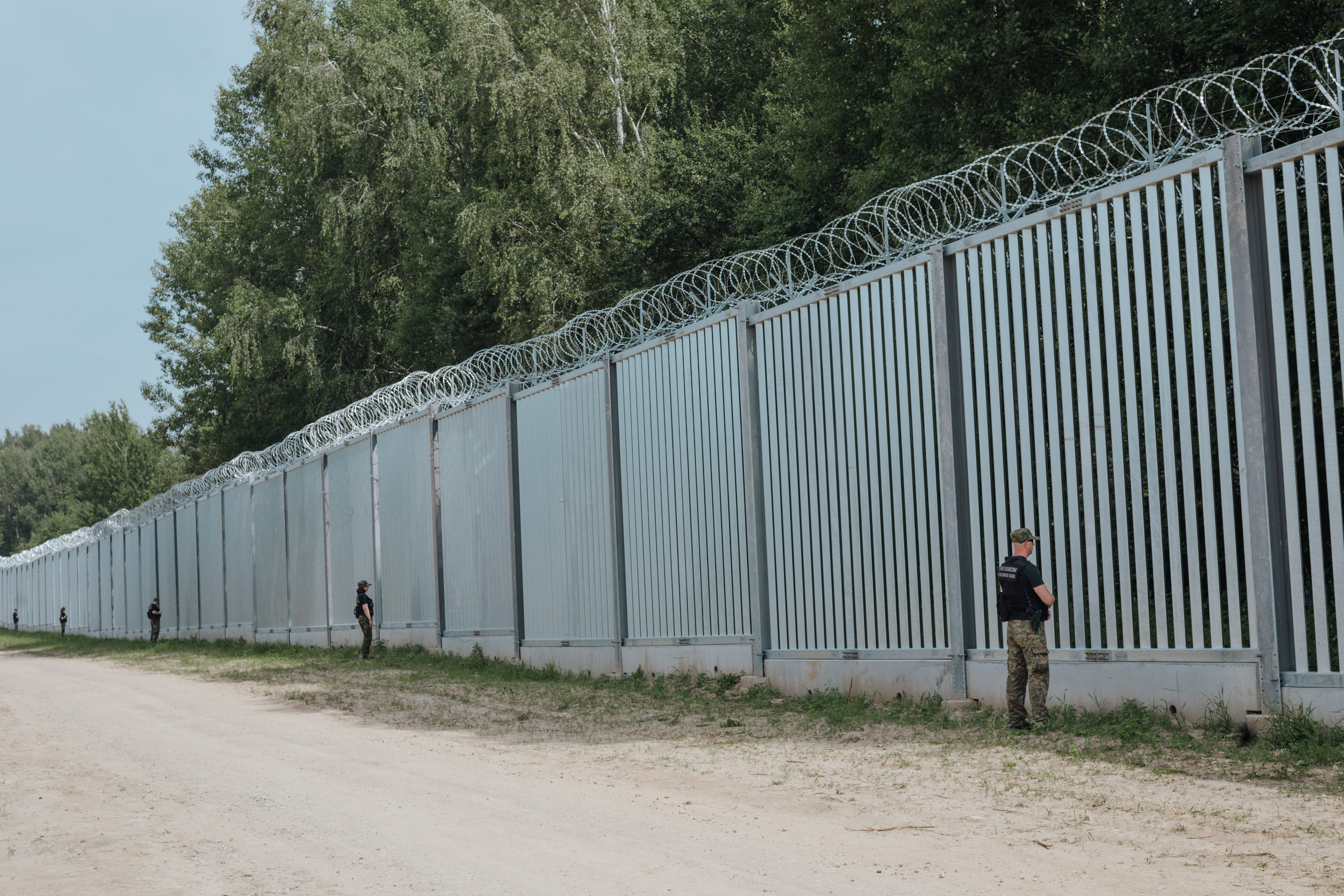
Polish Border Guard officers stationed by the border barrier in June 2022

In August 2021, a wave of illegal immigrants started fleeing through Belarus to Poland. Belarus was accused of hybrid warfare by orchestrating and supporting illegal crossing of the border in forest areas. Poland has recently reinforced the border with 1,000 men and is planning to build a border fence due to a massive influx of immigrants. The Poland–Belarus barrier was completed in June 2022. The UK assisted with the barrier. Over 2000 immigrants tried to illegally cross the Belarus border and 800 were successful, landing in state-run centres issued to aid them, many of which have been waiting near the border for more than a week. Poland's prime minister Mateusz Morawiecki stated that Poland must protect its borders and the people crossing the Polish—Belarusian border are being used by Lukashenko.

On 25 August 2021, the European Court of Human Rights (ECHR) summoned Poland and Latvia to provide the migrants "food, water, clothing, adequate medical care and, if possible, temporary shelter", according to a statement from the court. "The measure will apply for a period of three weeks from today until 15 September 2021 inclusive", with the ECHR judge citing the European Convention on Human Rights, while stating that neither country was ordered to allow the migrants through the border.

On 24 November 2021, the Human Rights Watch reported that thousand of people were stuck at the border of Belarus and Poland in circumstances that violated human rights and put their lives at risk. Polish officials pushed back those who try to cross while Belarusian officials beat and detained those who return. People have spent days or weeks in the open on the border, without shelter or access to basic humanitarian services, including food and water, resulting in deaths.

On 15 February 2022, OHCHR reported that human rights defenders, including media workers and interpreters face threats and intimidation at the border with Belarus. The organization called on Poland authorities to investigate all allegations of harassment and grant access to journalists and humanitarian workers to the border area ensuring that they can work freely and safely.

=== 2023 violation of Polish airspace ===
In 2023, two Belarusian military helicopters were seen provoking Poland, by going from Belarus to Poland without authorisation. A few days before this, Poland stated that they would send more troops to the border, after Belarus taunted Poland about the Russian Wagner Group.

=== 2024 ===
On 28 May 2024, a Polish soldier was injured after being stabbed along the Poland-Belarus border by an illegal immigrant trying to enter the country illegally during a patrol in Podlaskie Voivodeship. He later died of his injuries on 6 June.

On 29 May 2024, two Polish border guards were injured in an attack by illegal immigrants along the Poland-Belarus border.

=== 2025 ===
In March 2025, Poland suspended the right to apply for asylum at the Belarus-Poland border, with the European Commission supporting Poland's move.

On the night of September 11–12, 2025, Poland officially closed its land border due to the Russian-Belarusian military exercises Zapad-2025. The crossings on the Polish-Belarusian border were reopened on the night of September 25, 2025.

At midnight on November 17, Poland again reopened the Kuźnica and Bobrowniki border checkpoints, which had been closed in 2021 and 2023. Polish authorities stated that this decision was linked to the economic needs of border regions and the stabilization of the migration crisis at the border.

== Border crossings ==
Listed from north to south:

Image	Name	Polish Road	Belarusian Road	Type of crossing	Status	Coordinates
	Rudawka – Liasnaya	–	–	Simplified crossing	?	
	Kuźnica – Grodno	–	–	Railway	?	
	Kuźnica - Bruzgi	National road 19 (Poland)	M2 highway (Belarus)	Road	Open	
	Bobrowniki – Berestovica	National road 65 (Poland)	P99 highway (Belarus)	Road	Open	
	Siemianówka – Svislach	–	–	Railway	Open	
	Białowieża - Pyerarova		P81 highway (Belarus)	Simplified crossing	?	
	Połowce - Pyaschatka	National road 66 (Poland)	P16 highway (Belarus)	Road	Closed	
	Czeremcha – Vysoka	–	–	Railway	?	
	Kukuryki – Kazłovičy	National road 68 (Poland)	M1 highway (Belarus)	Road	Open	
	Terespol – Brest	–	–	Railway	Closed	
	Terespol – Brest	National road 2 (Poland)	P17 highway (Belarus)	Road	Open	
	Sławatycze - Damachava	National road 63 (Poland)	P94	Road	Closed	

== See also ==
- Poland–Belarus barrier
- Belarus–Poland relations
- Borders of Belarus
- Borders of Poland – Political boundaries between Poland and neighboring territories
- Polish Border Guard – Polish organization
- Refugees in Poland
- State Border Committee of the Republic of Belarus – Armed border guard of Belarus
