= State of emergency in Poland (2021) =

2021 security declaration by the Polish government

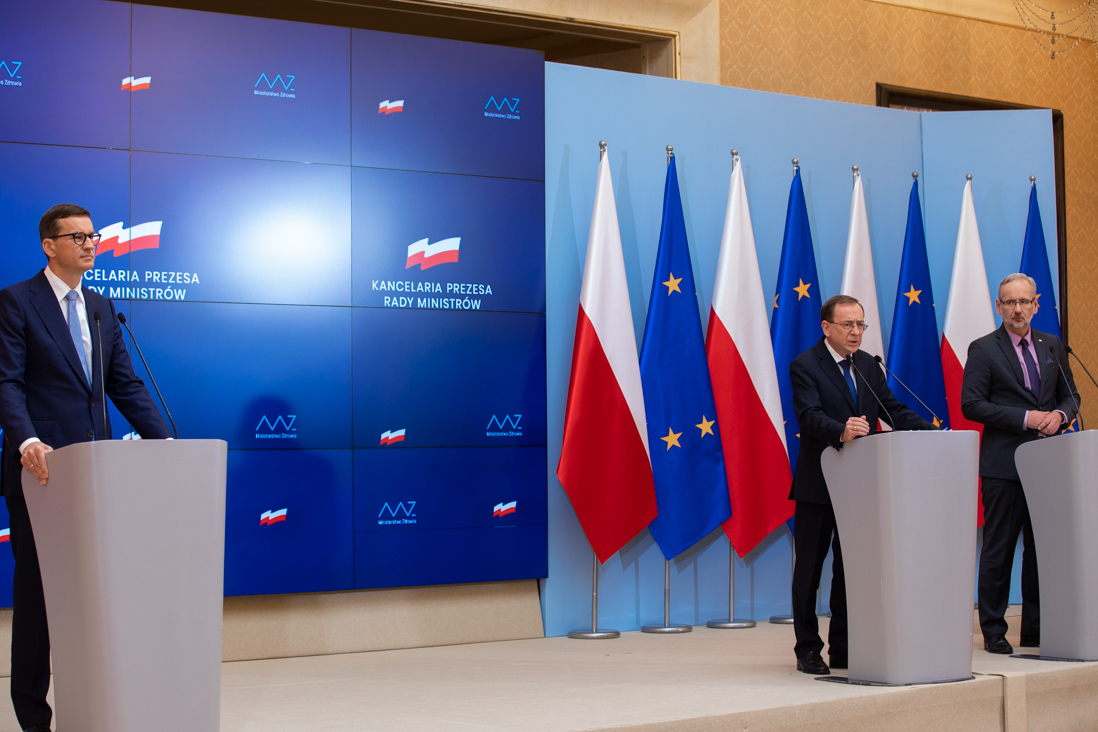
Polish politicians announcing the state of emergency

A state of emergency was declared in Poland by President Andrzej Duda on 2 September 2021.

The state of emergency was declared on request of Council of Ministers of the Republic of Poland. It covered 183 localities near the Belarusian border: 115 in Podlaskie Voivodeship and 68 in Lublin Voivodeship.

== Background ==
On 31 August 2021, the Council of Ministers requested President Andrzej Duda to declare a state of emergency in the terrain surrounding Belarus–Poland border. The request was motivated by – according to government – possible threats to security and public order in part of the territory of Poland.

On 2 September 2021, President Andrzej Duda agreed to declare a state of emergency in the area indicated in the request. On the same day, the regulation was published in the Dziennik Ustaw and thus became effective. Journalists, humanitarian workers, healthcare workers and activists which waited 21 days to get access to the refugees camping in Usnarz Górny were given time until the end of 2 September to move out of the areas under the state of emergency.

== Reactions ==
Representatives of Fundacja Ocalenie who have been at the border in Usnarz Górny since August 2021 openly opposed and criticized the declaration of the state of emergency. According to their spokesperson, the state was only declared for political benefit and allowed the state forces to act without supervision. Several members of the opposition also raised similar concerns. Donald Tusk, former Prime Minister of Poland, stated that the state of emergency is used by the Law and Justice party as a smoke screen to cover their government's incompetence.
