= Church of the Nativity of the Blessed Virgin Mary, Rogacze =

Orthodox church in Rogacze, Poland

Church of the Nativity of the Blessed Virgin Mary
- Cerkiew Narodzenia Przenajświętszej Bogurodzicy
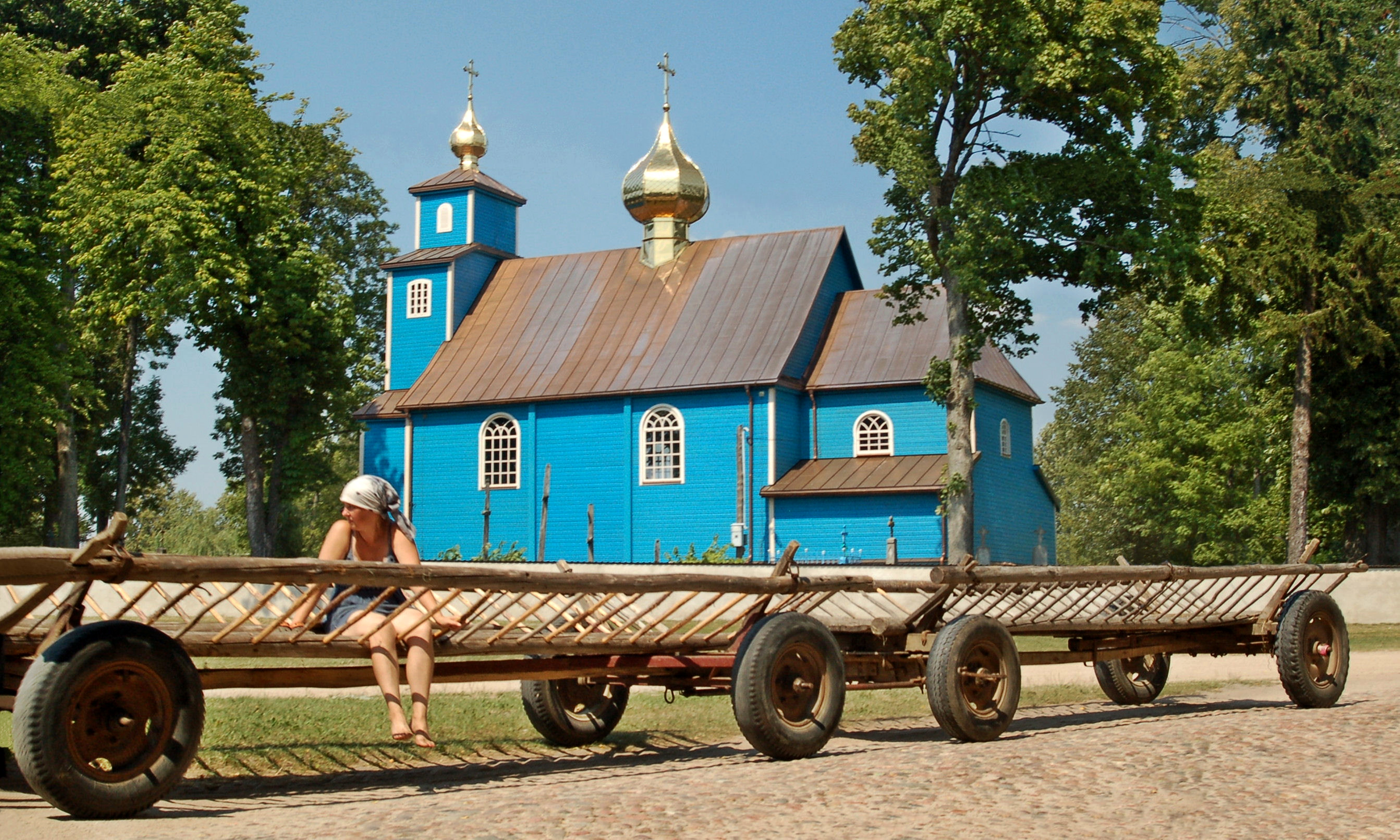
- Church of the Nativity of the Blessed Virgin Mary
- 52°30′33.0″N 23°13′50.8″E
- Location: Rogacze
- Country: Poland
- Denomination: Eastern Orthodoxy
- Churchmanship: Polish Orthodox Church

History
- Status: active Orthodox church
- Dedication: Nativity of Mary

Architecture
- Years built: first half of the 19th century–1873

Specifications
- Materials: wood

Administration
- Diocese: Diocese of Warsaw and Bielsk

The Church of the Nativity of the Blessed Virgin Mary is an Orthodox parish church in Rogacze. It belongs to the Kleszczele Deanery of the Diocese of Warsaw and Bielsk of the Polish Orthodox Church.

The Orthodox church in Rogacze existed at the beginning of the 17th century. It is not possible to determine precisely when the local parish joined the Uniate Church, but it definitely occurred no later than the middle of that century. In the 18th century, funded by Jerzy Matuszewicz, a new Uniate church was erected on the site of an older, very dilapidated temple. During the same century, the cult of St. Anthony emerged in Rogacze, with his image reportedly appearing miraculously on a tree. According to Grzegorz Sosna, the venerated figure was initially Anthony of Padua.

In 1839, the church in Rogacze was administratively incorporated into the Russian Orthodox Church following the resolutions of the Synod of Polotsk. After this date, the church became a center for the veneration of Anthony of Kiev. In 1872, the building was completely destroyed by fire. The burnt church was replaced by a temple purchased from the parish in Dubiny. In 1940, a second altar dedicated to Anthony of Kiev was installed in the Rogacze church. Four years later, the building was severely damaged by artillery shelling. After the war, the building was renovated several times, with a thorough renovation taking place at the beginning of the 21st century.

The church is located in the eastern part of the village, at the intersection of roads leading to Miedwieżyki and Mikulicze.

== History ==
=== 16th–18th century ===
According to Jerzy Hawryluk, the first church in Rogacze (formerly Rohacze) was established in 1525. However, Maria Kałamajska-Saeed argues that it is one of the many Orthodox churches in Podlachia with unclear origins, noting that the first mention of it appears only in 1610. Similarly, Grzegorz Sosna begins his account of the church's history from 1610. In 1624, Vasil Kaleczycki, the village owner, noted in his family diary: I rebuilt the Rohacze church and renovated everything, and equipped it, which cost 400 zlotys including the building, craftsmen, and equipment. Initially, the church was under the jurisdiction of the Eparchy of Volodymyr and Brest. Later, the local parish adopted the Union (no later than the mid-17th century) and became part of the Uniate Eparchy of Volodymyr–Brest.

The first detailed description of the Uniate church in Rogacze dates back to 1725, recorded during a canonical visitation of the local parish. The document noted that the building was very old, made of wood, and in poor technical condition (especially the church porch and belfry, which were at risk of collapse), lacking a dome and cross, and having a leaky roof. The structure had two windows and no floor. The church still had royal doors, but the iconostasis was not mentioned. The church inventory included a Polish-language Gospel, a Church Slavonic Irmologion, and two bells, only one of which was usable as the other was broken. The parish lacked a complete set of liturgical books, which were borrowed from other pastoral centers. The document also noted the presence of five paintings in the side altars and eight small Moscow icons, i.e., Orthodox icons created before the Union of Brest.

The poor condition of the church in Rogacze likely prompted the local landowner, starosta Józef Jerzy Matuszewicz, to construct a new temple. According to a 19th-century church chronicle, this occurred in the late 1740s, coinciding with the appearance of an icon of St. Anthony on a pear tree in Rogacze. Placed to the right of the royal doors in the church, it became the object of particular veneration. Some sources indicate the image depicted Anthony of Kiev, making him the patron of the new church. However, according to Father Grzegorz Sosna, during the Uniate period, the church venerated Anthony of Padua, with the cult of Anthony of Kiev developing only after the parish returned to Orthodoxy. Until 1939, liturgical celebrations in honor of Anthony of Kiev were held in Rogacze on June 13, the feast day of Anthony of Padua in the Latin Church. It was only in that year that the parson, Stefan Iwankiewicz, moved the celebration to the feast day of Anthony of Kiev according to the Orthodox tradition.

=== Orthodox church after 1839 ===
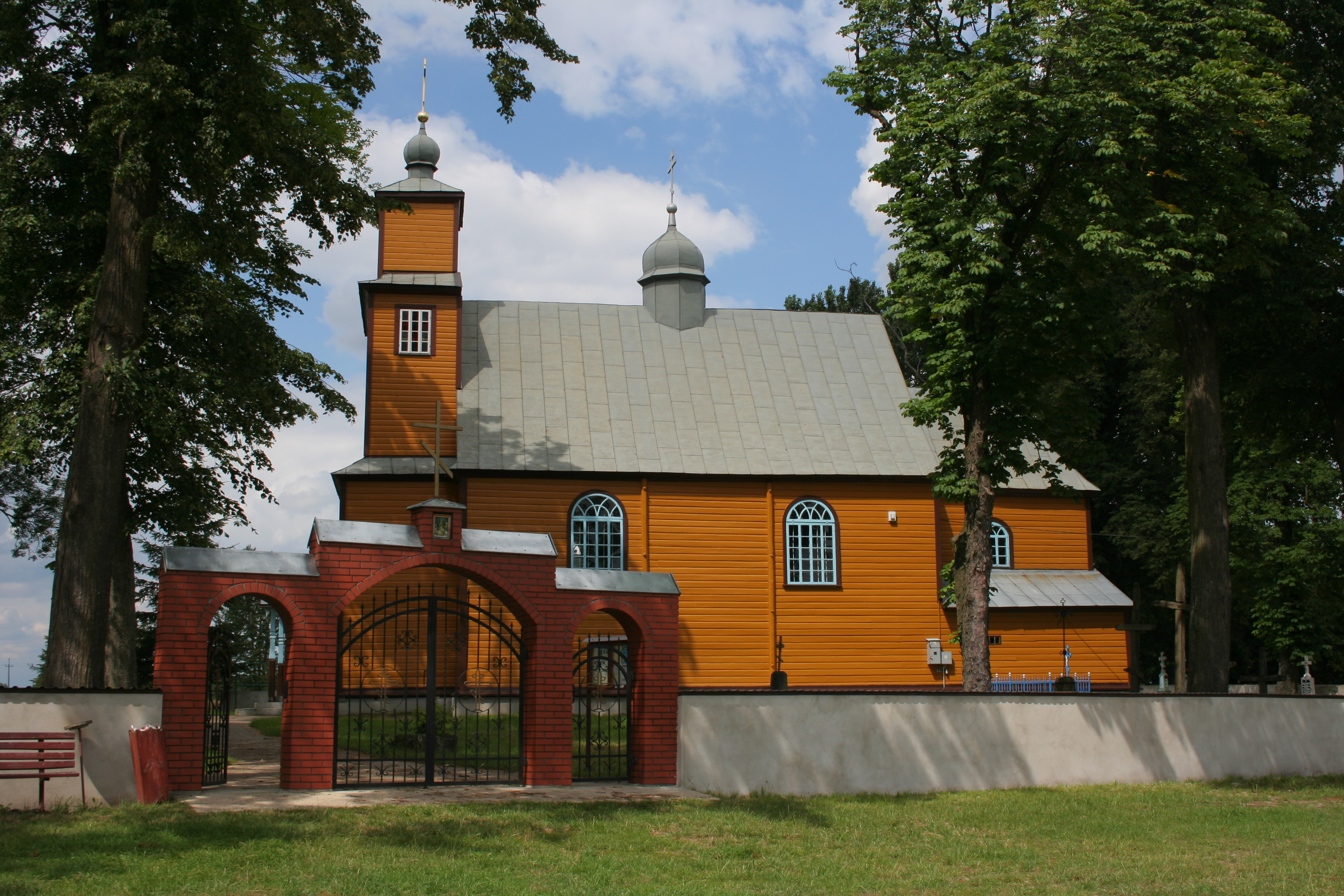
View of the church before the renovation in 2011

In the first half of the 19th century, the church in Rogacze was not a parish church. In 1839, by the decision of the Synod of Polotsk, all Uniate structures in Podlachia were incorporated into the Russian Orthodox Church. The next information about the existence of an independent parish in Rogacze dates back to 1865.

In 1872, Father Vasily Charlampovich, the parson in Rogacze, decided to gild the silver cover on the icon of St. Anthony. As a result, the image was taken out of the church. In the same year, the wooden church burned down, likely due to accidental fire, and the only piece of equipment saved was a cross that had been in the church porch. The following year, the parish in Rogacze purchased a wooden church previously located in Dubiny. This church was built in the first half of the 18th century or the first half of the 19th century and was relocated in 1873. On 8 September 1873, the church was reconsecrated, and local parishioners paid for new furnishings. The image of St. Anthony, which was outside the building at the time of the fire, was also brought into the new church.

In 1905, the Rogacze parish had 1,473 members. On 2 August 1915 (July 20 according to the Julian calendar), after the celebrations on St. Elijah's Day, all Orthodox residents of the village went into exile. Before leaving, they participated in a service in the church, after which they removed the most valuable items, including the icon of St. Anthony. Orthodox residents returned to the village between 1919 and 1921, but the image was lost. It was replaced with a copy written by the monk Archip from the Zhyrovichy Monastery.

In independent Poland, the church in Rogacze was initially registered as a parish (in 1918), but later this status was revoked. Until 1929, it was only a filial church of the St. Barbara parish in Milejczyce. In the 1930s, the roof and floor of the church and the surrounding fence were repaired. In 1940, a second altar was installed in the church, dedicated to St. Anthony of Kiev, funded by a parishioner who wanted to express gratitude for being cured of epilepsy. On 23 July 1944, the church was severely damaged by artillery fire. Several shells hit the church during the celebrations in honor of St. Anthony, killing one person. In the first years after World War II, nearly one-third of the parishioners left for the Soviet Union.

In 1954, the church was repainted (inside and outside), an electrical system was installed, and the roof was replaced. Six years later, three bells were purchased. These initiatives were led by Father Jan Juzwuk, who served the parish from 1953 to 1973. Additional renovations were carried out by Father Piotr Martyniuk, the parson from 1990 to 2000. Under his leadership, the interior was repainted, and the historic iconostasis was restored. In 1996, a fire broke out in the church but was quickly extinguished without causing significant damage.

In 2003, a small chapel was built near the church, where the water blessing rites have since been conducted. Four years later, the bell tower, which had started to lean, was repaired, and in 2009, a comprehensive renovation of the entire building was carried out (replacing the siding and foundations, reinforcing the bell tower structure and roof truss, replacing the church’s metal sheets, domes, and windows). The church was entered into the register of historical monuments on 16 June 2009 under number A-235.

In 2011, the church was renovated, altering the shape of the onion dome over the nave and changing its color scheme.

== Architecture ==
=== Building structure ===
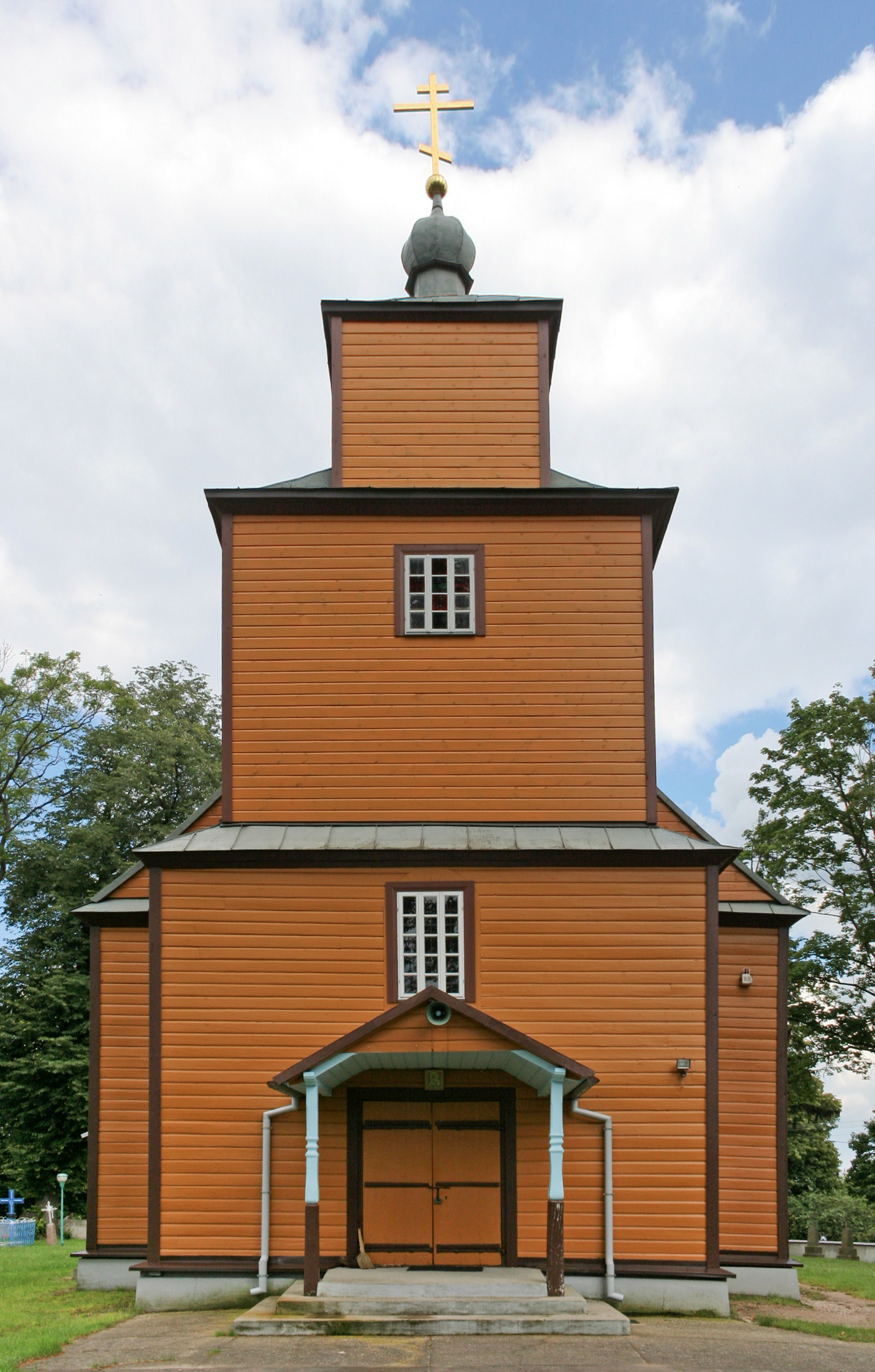
Facade of the church (before the renovation and repainting)

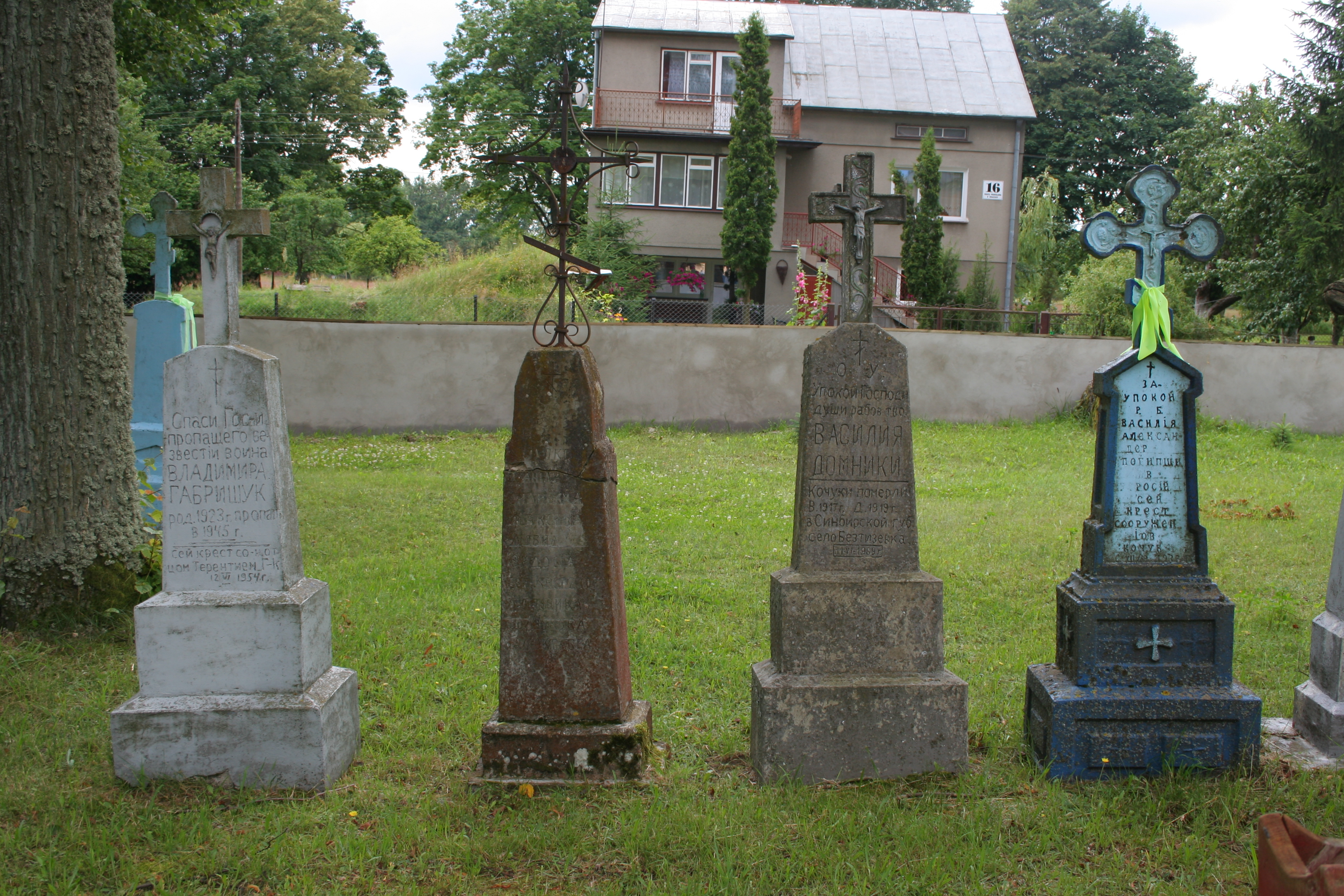
Crosses near the church erected in memory of parishioners who died during the mass deportations (the first two on the right) and a soldier who went missing (the first on the left)

The church in Rogacze is a wooden building with a log structure reinforced with vertical beams, oriented, and tripartite in design. The entrance at the front is preceded by a porch supported by two pillars. Above the narrower church porch is a bell tower with three tapering levels, topped with an octagonal onion dome. The chancel is smaller than the nave and is rectangular in shape, with two lower sacristies adjoining it. The church porch and nave have gable roofs, while above the main body of the building, there is an octagonal metal turret topped with an onion-shaped tented roof. The chancel has a three-sided roof. The nave’s ceiling is flat, supported by four pillars. On the west side of the church, there is a matroneum supported by two pillars.

=== Interior ===
The church's iconostasis dates back to 1874 and was crafted in an Eclectic style. It is arranged in three tiers. To the right of the iconostasis, a Golgotha is displayed for veneration. Older than the iconostasis is the tabernacle, from the second quarter of the 19th century, topped with a radiant glory featuring the figure of the Resurrected Christ on the front and scenes of the Entombment and Resurrection on the back. The church's furnishings also include a Baroque chalice, made in the 18th century in Gdańsk, which was likely brought to Rogacze from the church in Boćki. The Epitaphios was created around the same time as the iconostasis.

==== Icon of St. Anthony of Kiev ====
According to a 19th-century parish chronicle, the icon of St. Anthony was painted with oil paints on a rectangular board measuring 75 by 110 cm. It was placed in a gilded limewood frame. The image was covered by a silver riza, through which only the saint’s face and hands were visible. The replica of the image made by the monk Archip is an excellent copy of the original. It was placed in the frame and riza that were left in the Rogacze church in 1915. According to local tradition, miraculous healings occurred both before the original image between 18th and 19th centuries and before its replica in the interwar period.

== Bibliography ==
- Kołomajska-Saeed, M., ed. (1996). Katalog zabytków sztuki w Polsce. Siemiatycze, Drohiczyn i okolice (in Polish). Warsaw: Instytut Sztuki Polskiej Akademii Nauk.
- Sosna, G.; Troc-Sosna, A. (2006). Święte miejsca i cudowne ikony. Prawosławne sanktuaria na Białostocczyźnie (in Polish). Białystok: Orthdruk. ISBN 83-85368-69-8.
- Matus, I. (2013). Schyłek unii i proces restytucji prawosławia w obwodzie białostockim w latach 30. XIX wieku (in Polish). Białystok: Wydawnictwo Uniwersytetu w Białymstoku. ISBN 978-83-7431-364-3.
