= Zaleszany =

Zaleszany may refer to the following places:

- Zaleszany, Białystok County in Podlaskie Voivodeship (north-east Poland)
- Zaleszany, Hajnówka County in Podlaskie Voivodeship (north-east Poland)
- Zaleszany, Subcarpathian Voivodeship (south-east Poland)
