= Odła =

Odła Belarusian: Одла

Location
- Countries: Poland; Belarus

Physical characteristics
- Source
  - location: near Zubrzyca Mała, Podlaskie Voivodeship, Poland
  - coordinates: 53°22′39.0″N 23°43′43.0″E
- Mouth: Svislach,
  - location: south of Indura, Grodno region, Belarus
  - coordinates: 53.3464°N 23.8728°E
- Length: 18 km (11 mi)
- Basin size: 94 km^{2} (36 mi^{2})

Basin features
- Progression: Svislach→ Neman→ Baltic Sea

Odła (Belarusian: Одла - Odla) is a river of Poland and Belarus, a tributary of the Svislach. Its source is near the village Zubrzyca Mała in eastern Poland. It crosses the border with Belarus, and flows into the Svislach near the village Pachobuty, Byerastavitsa District.
