= Svislach (Neman) =

Svislach Świsłocz
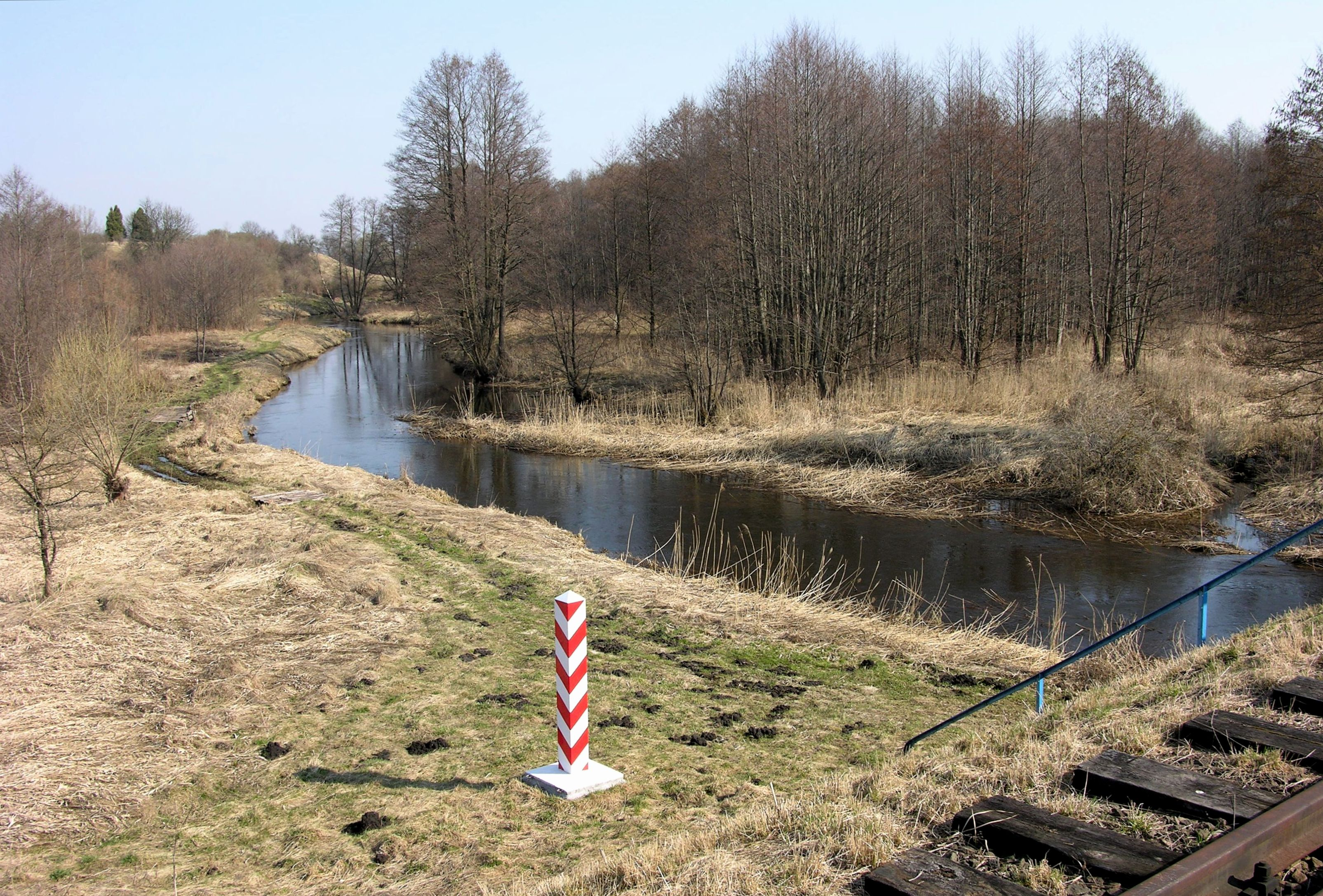
- Svislach by the Belarus-Poland border

Location
- Country: Belarus, Poland

Physical characteristics
- Mouth
  - location: Neman
  - coordinates: 53.5072°N 24.0664°E

Basin features
- Progression: Neman→ Baltic Sea

The Svislach (or Śvislač) (Belarusian: Свíслач, pronounced [ˈsʲvʲisɫatʂ]), Polish: Świsłocz), is a river in Grodno Oblast, Belarus, a left tributary of the Neman. A stretch of it runs along the Belarus–Poland border.

The source of the river is near the town of Svislach, in the south-west of Grodno Region, Belarus. It flows first in a westerly direction, before turning north, following the Polish border, near the village Dublany. Near Ozierany Małe it leaves the border and flows northeast to its confluence with the Neman at the small town Svislach, southeast of Grodno. Some of its tributaries are Odła and Usnarka.
