= Usnarka =

Usnarka Belarusian: Уснарка

Location
- Countries: Poland; Belarus

Physical characteristics
- Source
  - location: near Harkawicze, Sokółka County, Podlaskie Voivodeship, Poland
  - coordinates: 53°19′17.0″N 23°43′41.2″E
- Mouth: Svislach
  - location: northwest of Malaya Byerastavitsa, Grodno region, Belarus
  - coordinates: 53.3185°N 23.8606°E
- Length: 12 km (7.5 mi)
- Basin size: 86 km^{2} (33 sq mi)

Basin features
- Progression: Svislach→ Neman→ Baltic Sea

Usnarka (Belarusian: Уснарка - Usnarka) is a river of Poland and Belarus, a tributary of the Svislach. Its source is near the village Harkawicze in eastern Poland. It crosses the border with Belarus, and flows into the Svislach near the village Makarawtsy, Byerastavitsa District.
