= Borders of Belarus =

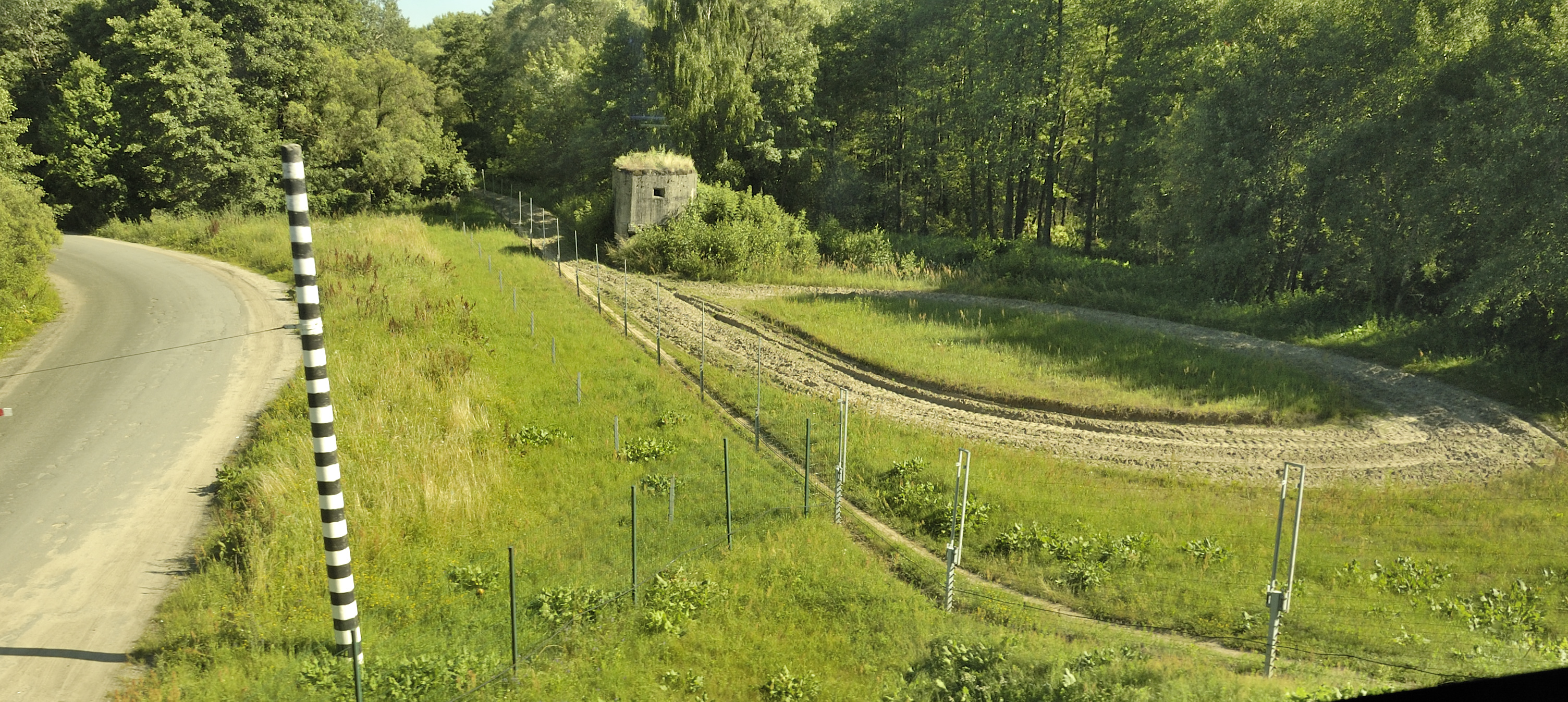
Border with Poland in Brest

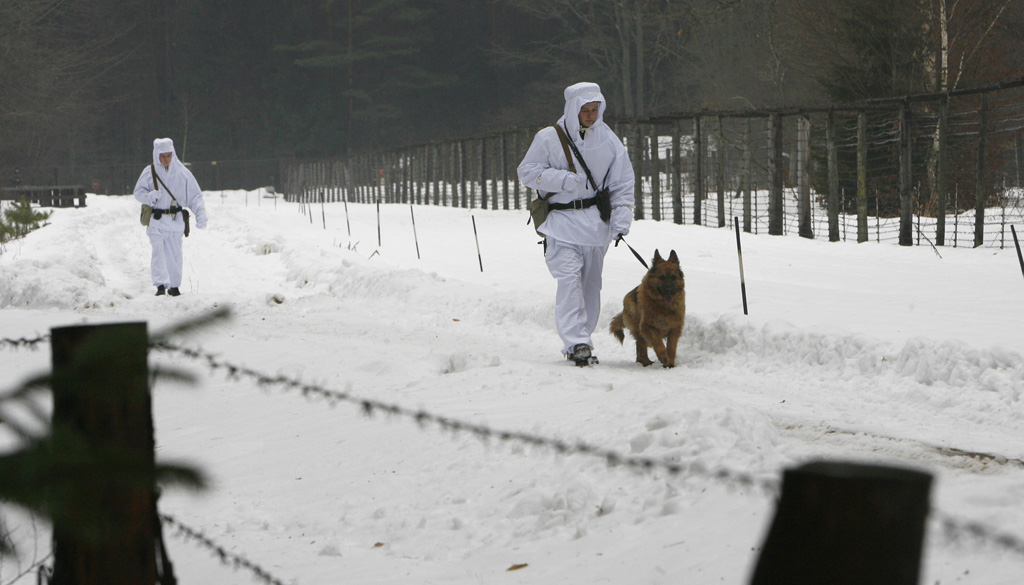
Belarusian Border Guards patrolling the Belarus-Poland border with working dog.

The state border of Belarus separates Belarus from 5 states and has a length of 2,969 kilometres (1,845 mi).

== History ==
The annexation of Western Belarus to the Soviet Union radically affected the state of protection of the state border with Lithuania by parts of the Belarusian District. After the accession of Western Belarus to the BSSR on October 15, 1939, the border detachments of the People’s Commissariat of Internal Affairs of the BSSR was tasked to guard the Belarusian section of the border with Germany, and on June 21, 1940, also the Lithuanian border. The former Soviet-Polish border was not fully dismantled and existed up until the German attack on the Soviet Union. For internal security purposes, the servicemen of the Belarusian border district carried out security service on the "old border", for the passage of which the population needed special passes.

Country	Length (km)	Notes
Latvia	172.912	Part of the European Union.
Lithuania	678.819	Part of the European Union.
Poland	398.624	Part of the European Union.
All area: European Union	1,250.355	
Russia	1,283	Including the Medvezhe-Sankovo enclave
Ukraine	1,084	
