= Rudaki, Podlaskie Voivodeship =

Rudaki
- Village
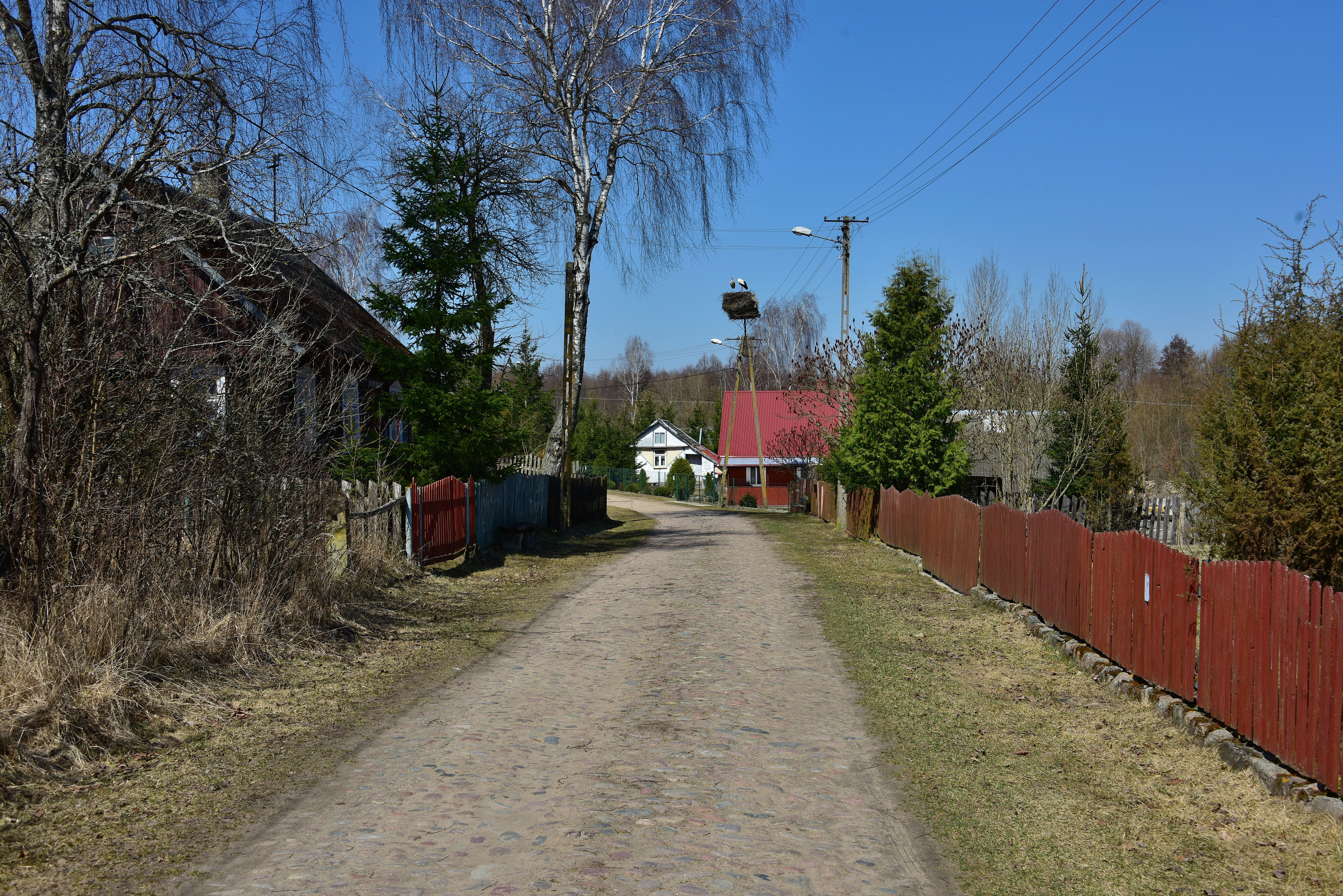

- Location within Poland
- Coordinates: 53°11′N 23°54′E
- Country: Poland
- Voivodeship: Podlaskie
- County: Sokółka
- Gmina: Krynki

Rudaki [ruˈdaki] is a village in the administrative district of Gmina Krynki, within Sokółka County, Podlaskie Voivodeship, in north-eastern Poland, close to the border with Belarus.

== History ==
From September 1939, the village was under the Soviet occupation. On November 2, 1939, Rudaki was incorporated into the Byelorussian Soviet Socialist Republic. During the German occupation, the village was located in the Sokólski Poviat (Landkreis Sokolka) in the Białystok District (Bezirk Bialystok). In the summer of 1944, on the west bank of Świsłocz, on the hills surrounding Rudaki, the Germans organized fortifications that were interrupted by the Red Army on July 21–22, 1944. As a result of the German attack on the USSR in 1941 and during the fighting in 1944, 23 Soviet soldiers died in Rudaki.

As a result of the fighting, the village was burnt. According to the reports, only 3 farms survived. After the capture of Rudak, some of the men were drafted into the Red Army. Until May 1948 within the borders of the Union of Soviet Socialist Republics. In the report of the County Inspector for Settlement in October 1946, the village was described as follows: “The village is generally poor, with about 150 farms. (...) Mixed Polish-Belarusian population. The attitude of the Belarusian population towards the Polish state was at least indifferent. ” According to reports, on May 25, 1948, as a result of the delimitation of the border, Rudaki was returned to Poland. The inhabitants of the village, despite the evacuation ordered by the Soviet authorities to the eastern (Soviet) shore of Świsłocz, remained in Rudaki. It was not without struggle and jostling with Soviet soldiers. Unfortunately, the graves (cemetery), where the inhabitants of Rudaki buried their dead for centuries, remained in Hołynka, on the Soviet side. For some time, funerals were organized in old, dating back to the First World War, graves located in the nearby hills, on plot no. 8 within Rudaki. After 1948, the children of the village attended the elementary school in Łosiniany and Chomontowce, and from 1958 to the newly erected brick elementary school in Kruszyniany. On June 20, 1966, the northern part of the village was destroyed by a fire. Rudaki were electrified in the early 1970s. In the first half of the years. 70 soldiers of the Border Protection Troops arranged a swimming pool on the Świsłoczą. At the end of the 1970s, about 50-60 people lived in the village. However, this number was gradually decreasing due to the migration of rural people to urban agglomerations. In 1983, another fire destroyed 4 barns in the southern part of the village. On October 18, 2011, the village council in Rudaki was liquidated
