= Adelsk =

Agrotown in Grodno Region, Belarus

Adelsk Адэльск (Belarusian) אַדעלסק
- Agrotown
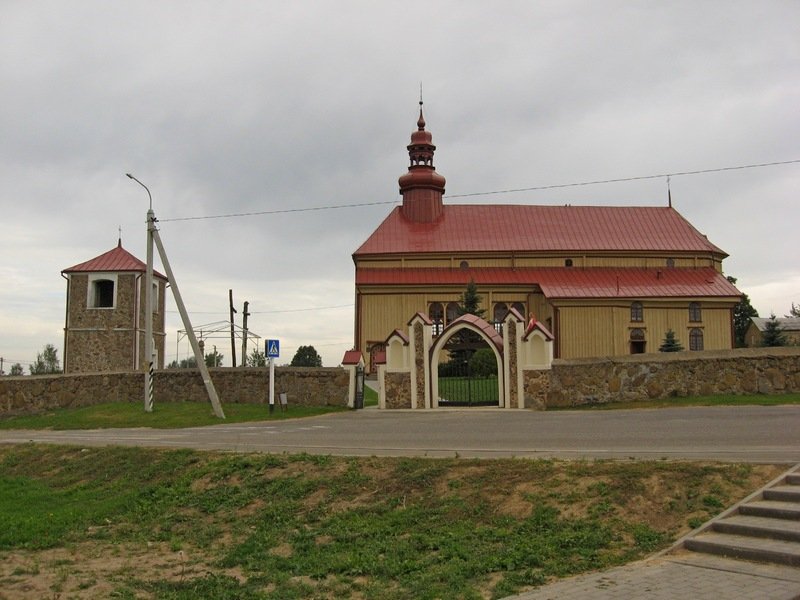

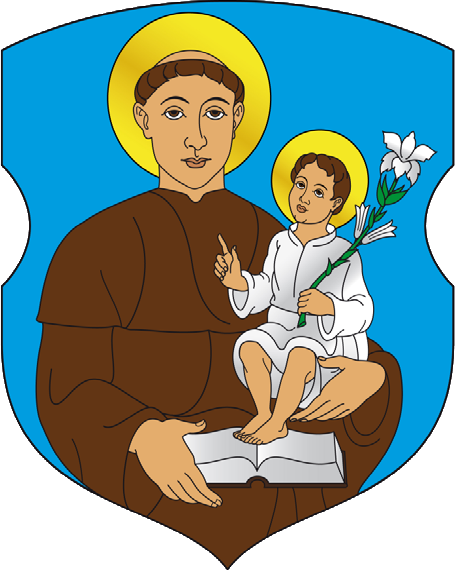
- Seal
- Interactive map of Adelsk
- Location within Belarus
- Coordinates: 53°24′20″N 23°45′45″E
- Country: Belarus
- Region: Grodno Region
- District: Grodno District
- Elevation: 172 m (564 ft)

Population (2010)
  - Total: 661
- Time zone: UTC+3 (MSK)
- Postal code: 231713
- Area code: +375 152

Adelsk (Belarusian: Адэ́льск, romanized: Adeĺsk; Russian: Оде́льск, romanized: Odelsk; Polish: Odelsk; Yiddish: אַדעלסק) is an agrotown in Grodno District, Grodno Region, Belarus. It serves as the administrative center of Adelsk selsoviet. It is located close to the border with Poland and 98 kilometres (61 mi) from Grodno. Its population is estimated at 661 inhabitants.

== History ==
=== Early history ===
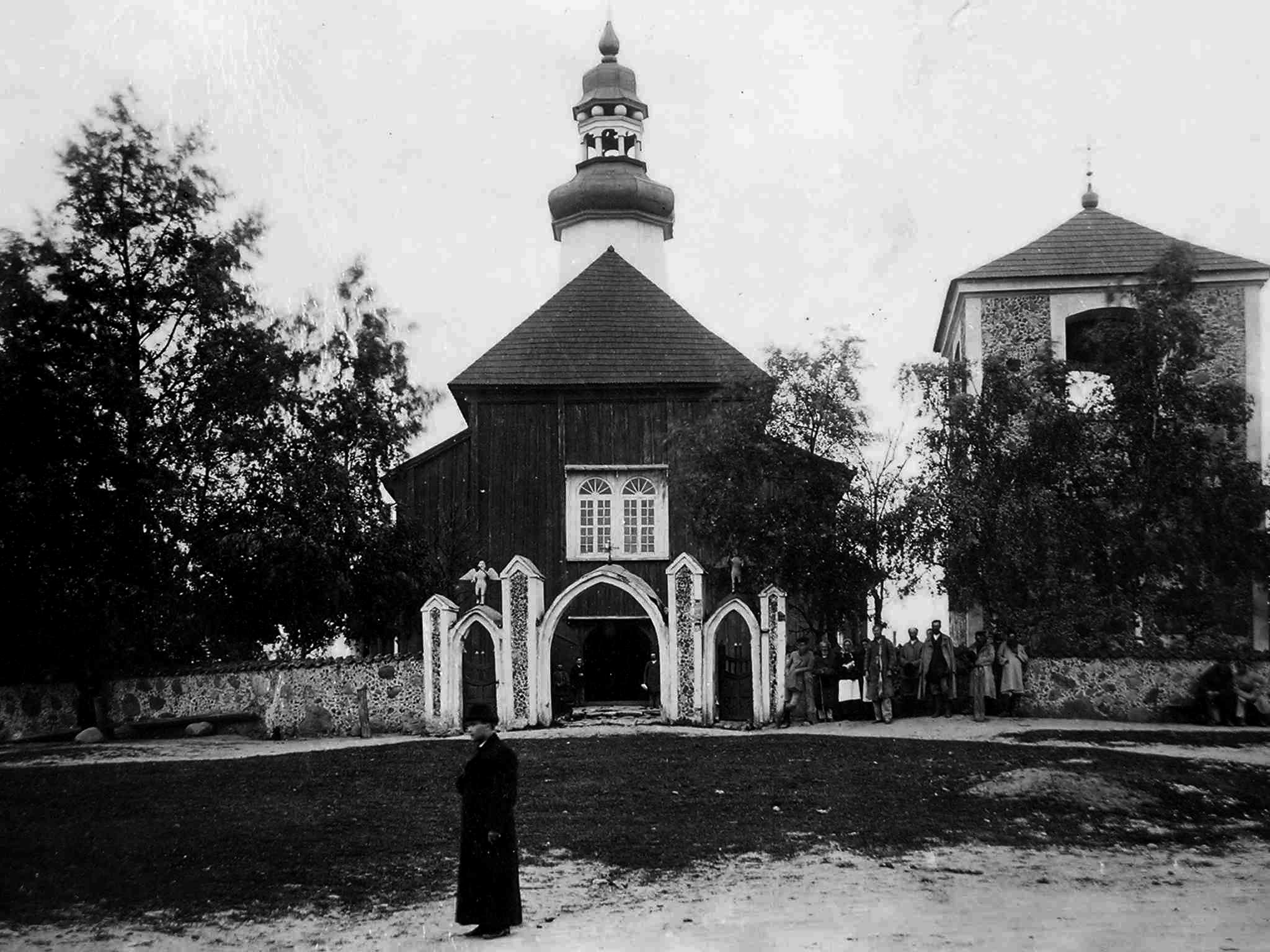
Church in Odelsk, c. 1900

It was granted town rights in 1546 by Queen consort of Poland Bona Sforza, confirmed by King Stephen Bathory in 1580. It was a royal town of the Polish–Lithuanian Commonwealth, administratively located in the Trakai Voivodeship in the Grand Duchy of Lithuania. In 1795, Adelsk was annexed by the Kingdom of Prussia as a result of the Third Partition of Poland and it became a part of New East Prussia. In 1807, the Treaties of Tilsit transferred Odelsk to the Russian Empire. Adelsk became a part of the Sokolsky Uyezd of Grodno Governorate.

=== 20th century ===
On 18 March 1921, the Peace of Riga between Poland on the one hand and Soviet Russia and Soviet Ukraine on the other hand defined Odelsk as a part of Poland. It was administratively located in the Sokółka County in the Białystok Voivodeship. According to the 1921 census, the population was 91.2% Polish and 8.6% Jewish.

==== World War II ====
In September 1939, the Red Army occupied Odelsk in the course of the Soviet invasion of Poland. On 14 November 1939, the Supreme Soviet of the Soviet Union incorporated Western Belorussia, including Odelsk, into the Byelorussian Soviet Socialist Republic. On 4 December 1939, Odelsk became a part of the newly created Belastok Region.

During the Soviet occupation of Eastern Poland The Soviets deported the Marcinowicz family and the Budrewicz family. In 1941, During the German occupation, the active organizer of the underground cells in the commune was Władysław Szupicki, the post manager in Sokółka. During the retreat, the Germans looked for hills and places convenient to stop the advancing Soviets and took people from nearby villages to dig trenches. For this purpose, they brought the inhabitants on trucks to the Indura area, near the village of Likówka. When a crowd of people got out of the vehicles, they were caught in massive fire from Soviet artillery, which killed over 70 people.

==== Post-war ====
After the war, the village was included in the Byelorussian Soviet Socialist Republic, even though the Curzon Line passed two kilometers east of the village, according to locals because the village contained few stone structures, which the Soviets wished to have for their use.

After the incorporation into the Byelorussian Soviet Socialist Republic, a group of 200 people fled to Poland. The others would be imprisoned for 25 years. After Stalin's death, everyone was released, and many went to Poland, although they were also under surveillance in their home country. In 1951, the boys escaped to the shelters from conscription to the Soviet Army. They were captured and convicted and imprisoned for 5–10 years. In the 1950s, nearly 100 of the town's 1,000 inhabitants were in prison.
