= Pyaschatka =

Pyaschatka Пясчатка (Belarusian)
- Village
- Location within Belarus
- Coordinates: 52°28′13″N 23°22′23″E
- Country: Belarus
- Region: Brest Region
- District: Kamyenyets District
- First mentioned: 1566
- Population: 18
- Postal code: 225071

Pyaschatka (Belarusian: Пясча́тка, romanized: Piasčatka; Russian: Песча́тка, romanized: Peschatka; Polish: Piszczatka Połowiecka) is a village in Kamyenyets District, Brest Region, Belarus. It is part of Rasna selsoviet and sits on the border with Poland.

== History ==
It was founded in the thirteenth century. as one of the settlements of the Polovtsians of Khan Tegak, who were resettled by Russian king Danylo Halytsky to protect his state from the attacks of the Yatvyags and Lithuanians. The founding is evidenced by the tract Bonyak, located near the village and named after the prominent Polovtsian khan.

It was first mentioned in 1566 in a revision of the Brest Eldership.

In the 18th century the village was in the possession of the Radziwill princes (in 1740 the peasants complained to Anna Radziwill about the oppression and abuse of soldiers who were on duty in the village). In 1792 it passed to the estates of Peter Ozharovsky. In 1795 after the third partition of the Commonwealth, the settlement became part of the Russian Empire.

In the 19th century the village was part of the Polovtsi estate of Count Starzhynsky. 267 inspected souls lived there. In the second half of the 19th century, it was in the Polovtsian Volost of the Brestsky Uyezd of the Grodno Governorate of the Russian Empire.

In Peschatka there was a parish board. There was the Polovtsian Folk School, where Makar Ignatovsky, the father of Belarusian public and political figure, historian, and the first president of the Academy of Sciences of Belarus Vsevolod Ignatovsky, worked as a teacher for a short time.

In 1921 as a result of the Polish–Soviet War under the Riga Peace Treaty as part of Poland, the village was included in the Polovtsian gmina of the Brest district of the Polesie Voivodeship. During the interwar period, the settlement had the official name Peschatka Polovetskaya. In 1928 the Polovtsian gmina was abolished and Peschatka became a part of Verkhovichi gmina. In September 1939 in accordance with the Molotov–Ribbentrop Pact, the Soviet Union invaded Poland and annexed lands in its eastern part to the Belarusian SSR, and so the village became part of the Brest Region of the BSSR.

In 1940 the village became part of the Galyansky Rural Council of the Klyashchelsky district of the Brest Region. During World War II, 10 villagers were killed. In 1945–1948 the settlement was part of Poland. The village returned to the Belarusian SSR as a result of modification of the Soviet-Polish state border. Since 1954 the village has been part of Rasnyansky Rural Council (of which Rasna is the administrative center). In 1962 it became part of the Kamenets District.
