= Rudawka, Augustów County =

Rudawka
- Village
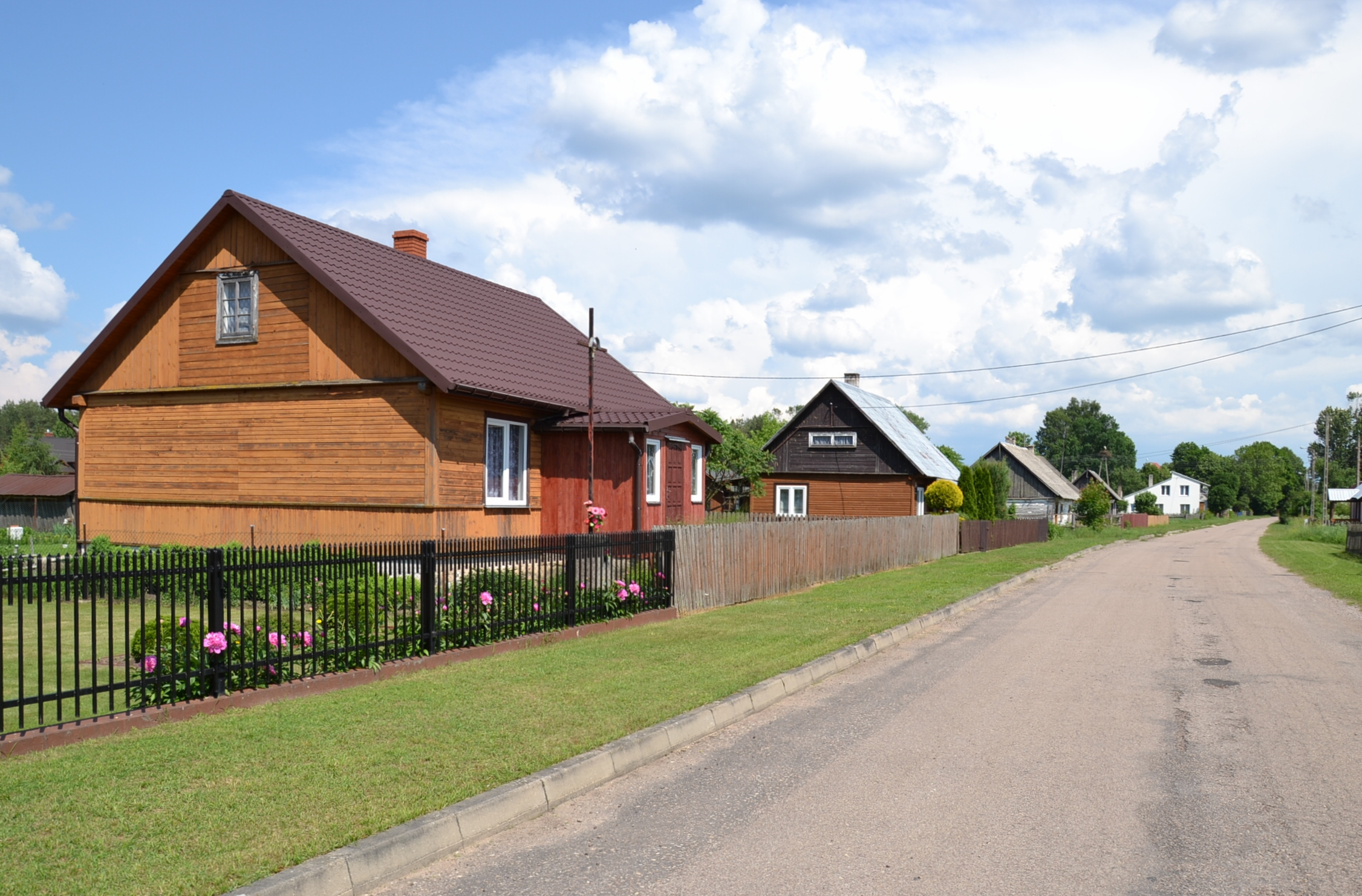
- Main street in the village

- Location within Poland
- Coordinates: 53°52′3″N 23°30′33″E
- Country: Poland
- Voivodeship: Podlaskie
- County: Augustów
- Gmina: Płaska
- Population: 180

Rudawka [ruˈdafka] is a village in the administrative district of Gmina Płaska, within Augustów County, Podlaskie Voivodeship, in north-eastern Poland, close to the border with Belarus.
