= Rakowicze, Augustów County =

Rakowicze
- Village
- Location within Poland
- Coordinates: 53°44′28″N 23°34′6″E
- Country: Poland
- Voivodeship: Podlaskie
- County: Augustów
- Gmina: Lipsk

Rakowicze [rakɔˈvit͡ʂɛ] is a village in the administrative district of Gmina Lipsk, within Augustów County, Podlaskie Voivodeship, in north-eastern Poland, close to the border with Belarus.
