= Klimówka =

- Village
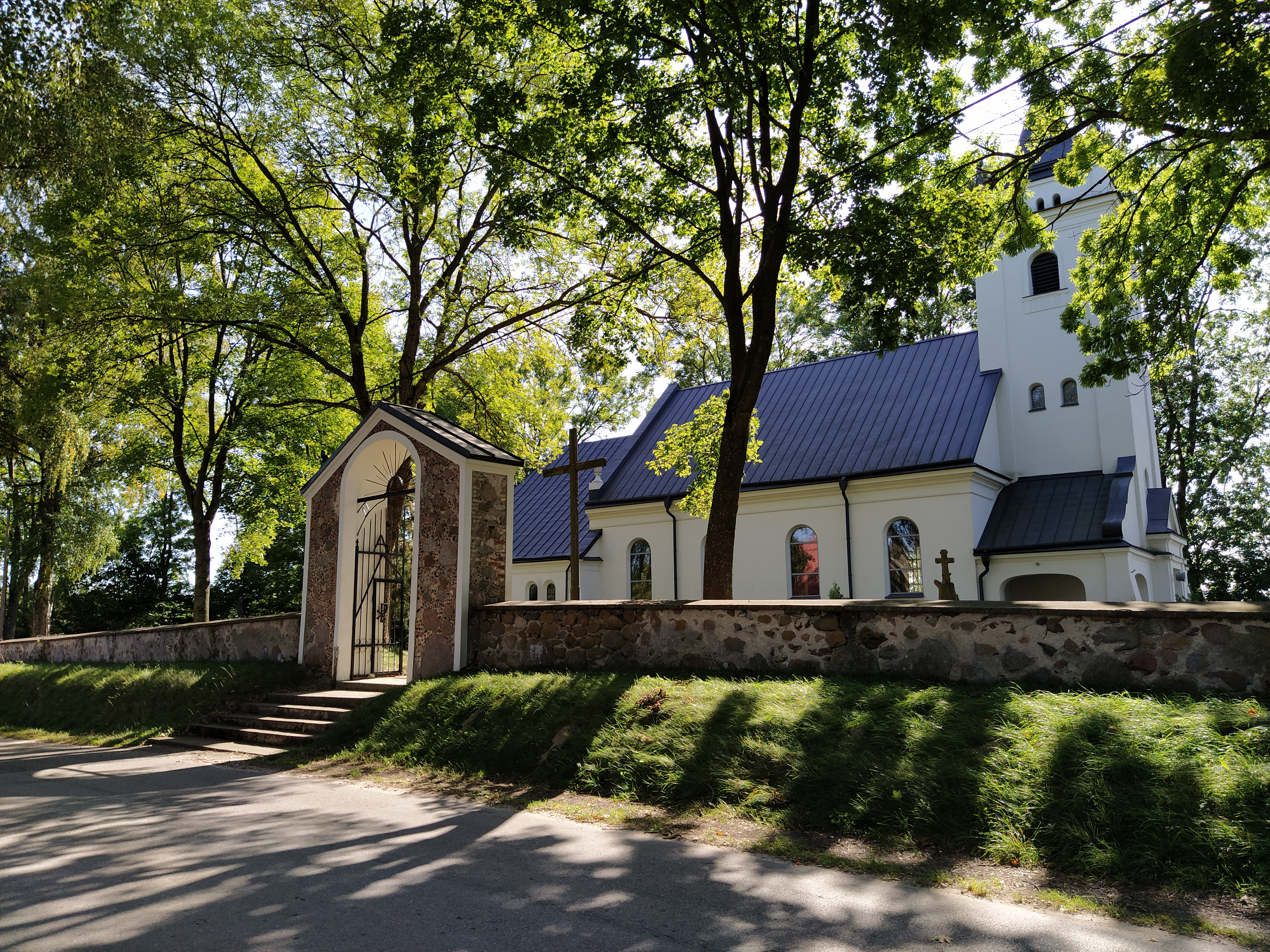

- Location within Poland
- Coordinates: 53°26′21″N 23°41′3″E
- Country: Poland
- Voivodeship: Podlaskie
- County: Sokółka
- Gmina: Kuźnica

Klimówka [kliˈmufka] is a village in the administrative district of Gmina Kuźnica, within Sokółka County, Podlaskie Voivodeship, in north-eastern Poland, close to the border with Belarus.
