= Szymaki, Podlaskie Voivodeship =

Szymaki
- Village
- Location within Poland
- Coordinates: 53°26′N 23°40′E
- Country: Poland
- Voivodeship: Podlaskie
- County: Sokółka
- Gmina: Kuźnica

Szymaki (Polish pronunciation: [ʂɨˈmakʲi]) is a village in the administrative district of Gmina Kuźnica, within Sokółka County, Podlaskie Voivodeship, in north-eastern Poland, close to the border with Belarus.
