= Chomontowce =

- Village
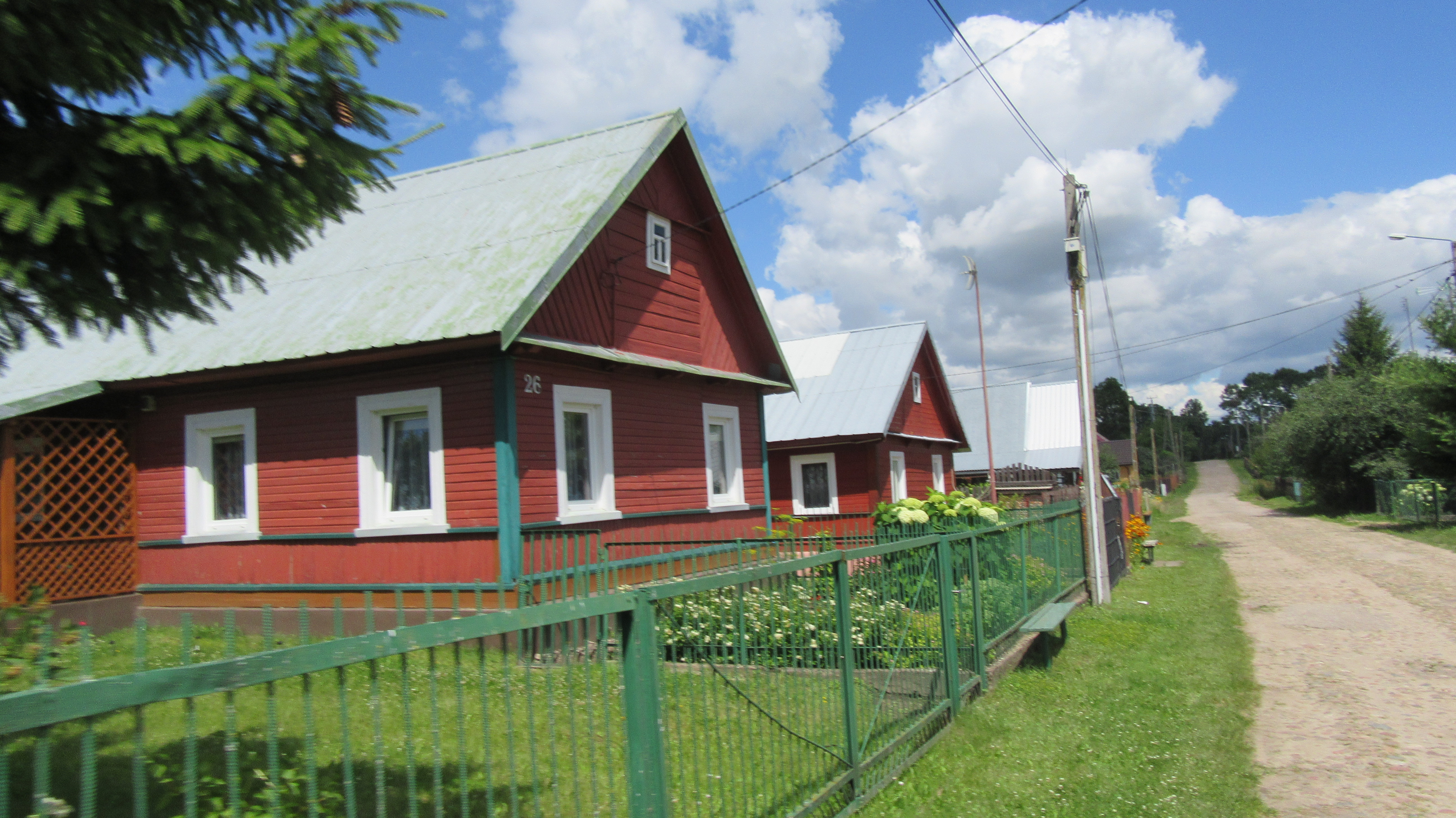
- Houses in the village

- Location within Poland
- Coordinates: 53°08′53″N 23°54′18″E
- Country: Poland
- Voivodeship: Podlaskie
- County: Białystok
- Gmina: Gródek

Chomontowce [xɔmɔnˈtɔft͡sɛ] is a village in the administrative district of Gmina Gródek, within Białystok County, Podlaskie Voivodeship, in north-eastern Poland, close to the border with Belarus.
