= Chlewiszcze =

Coordinates: 52°30′20″N 23°23′47″E

- Settlement
- Location within Poland
- Country: Poland
- Voivodeship: Podlaskie
- County: Hajnówka
- Gmina: Czeremcha

Chlewiszcze [xlɛˈviʂt͡ʂɛ] is a settlement in the administrative district of Gmina Czeremcha, within Hajnówka County, Podlaskie Voivodeship, in north-eastern Poland, close to the border with Belarus.
