= Bilminy =

- Village
- Location within Poland
- Coordinates: 53°25′56″N 23°39′58″E
- Country: Poland
- Voivodeship: Podlaskie
- County: Sokółka
- Gmina: Kuźnica

Bilminy [bilˈminɨ] is a village in the administrative district of Gmina Kuźnica, within Sokółka County, Podlaskie Voivodeship, in northeastern Poland, near the border with Belarus.
