= Chworościany =

- Village
- Location within Poland
- Coordinates: 53°37′N 23°36′E
- Country: Poland
- Voivodeship: Podlaskie
- County: Sokółka
- Gmina: Nowy Dwór

Chworościany [xfɔrɔɕˈt͡ɕanɨ] is a village in the administrative district of Gmina Nowy Dwór, within Sokółka County, Podlaskie Voivodeship, in north-eastern Poland, close to the border with Belarus.
