= Nomiki =

- Village
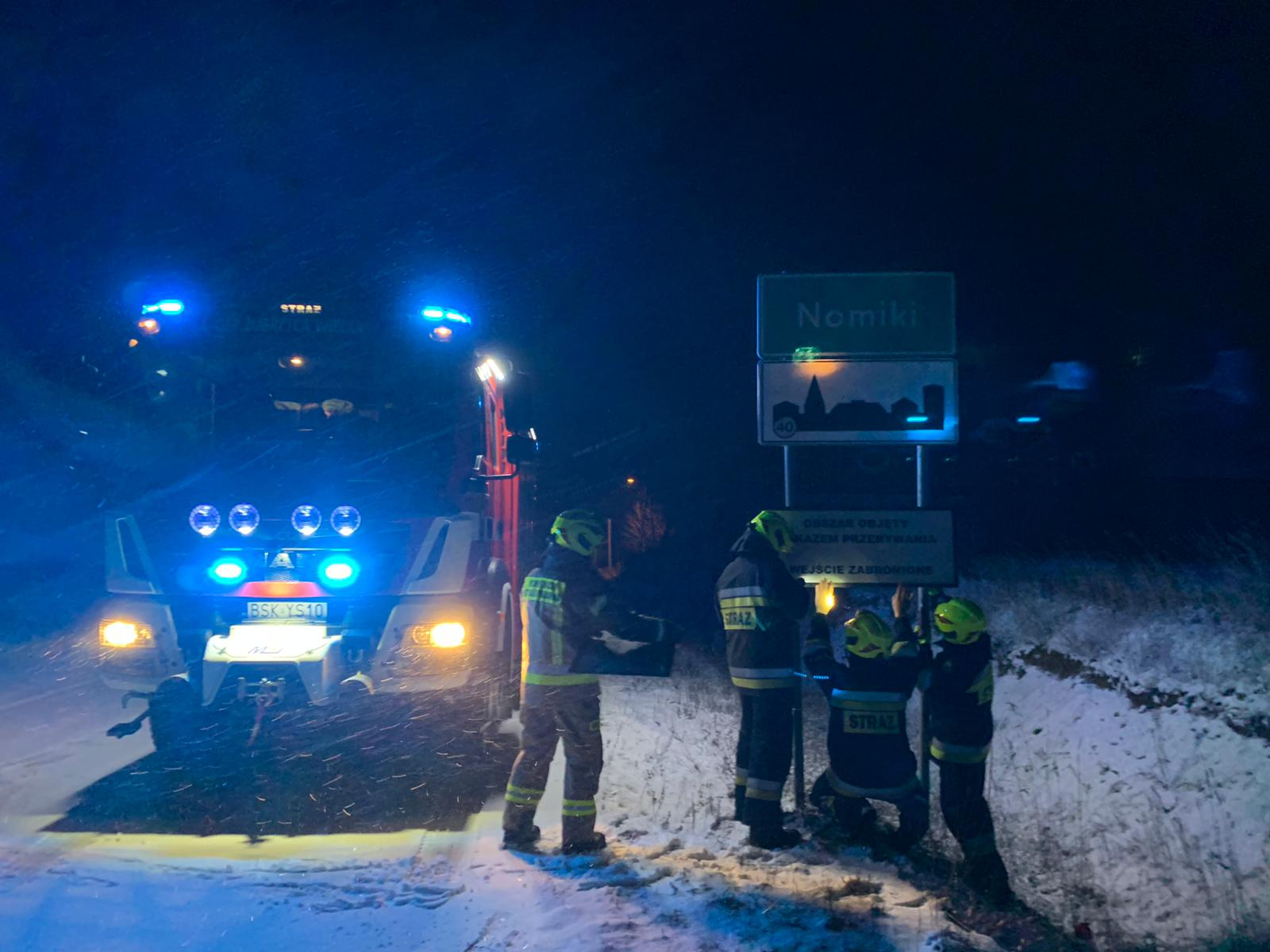

- Location within Poland
- Coordinates: 53°25′21″N 23°41′48″E
- Country: Poland
- Voivodeship: Podlaskie
- County: Sokółka
- Gmina: Sokółka

Nomiki [nɔˈmiki] is a village in the administrative district of Gmina Sokółka, within Sokółka County, Podlaskie Voivodeship, in north-eastern Poland, close to the border with Belarus.
