= Minkowce =

- Village
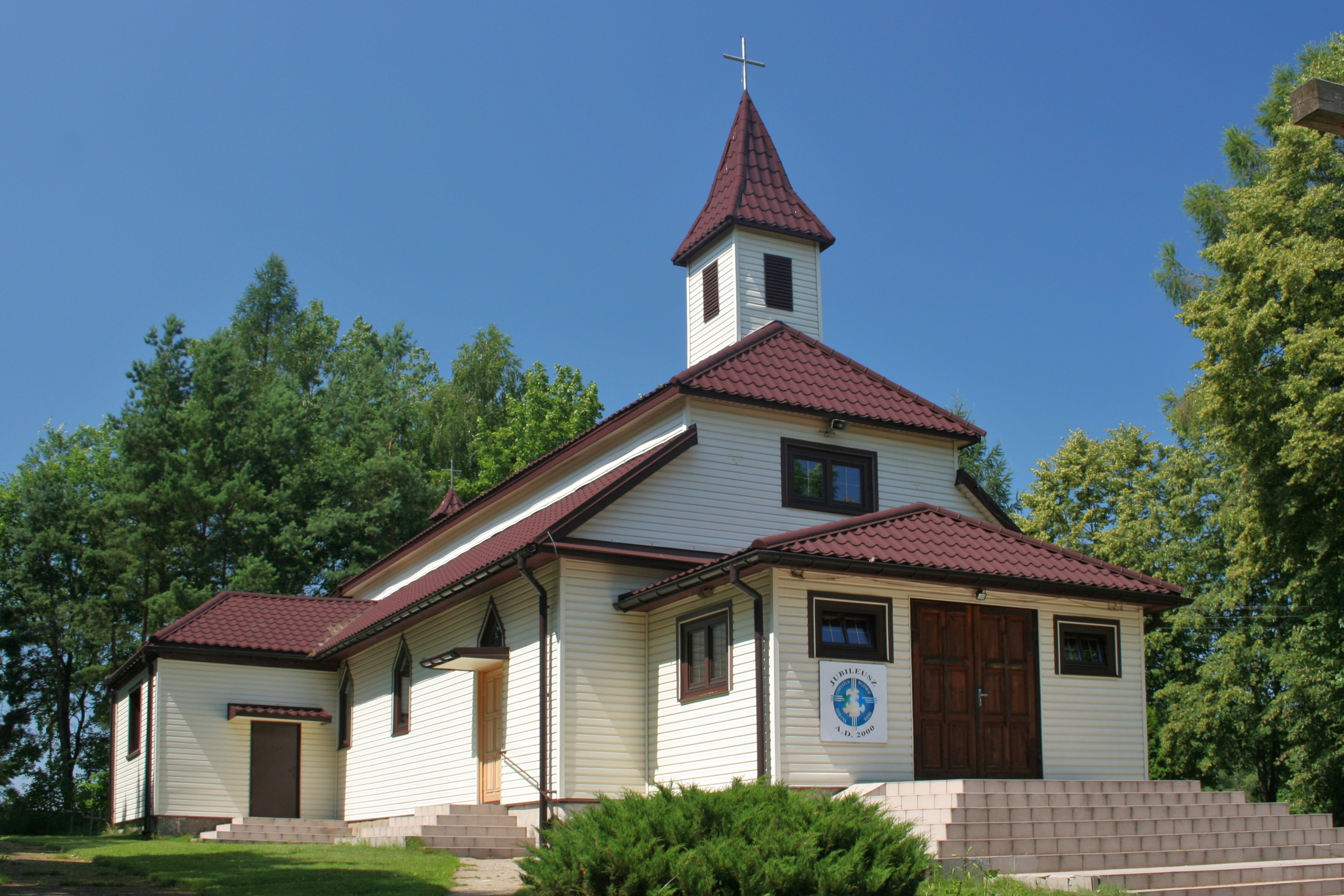

- Location within Poland
- Coordinates: 53°22′17″N 23°44′44″E
- Country: Poland
- Voivodeship: Podlaskie
- County: Sokółka
- Gmina: Szudziałowo

Minkowce [miŋˈkɔft͡sɛ] is a village in the administrative district of Gmina Szudziałowo, within Sokółka County, Podlaskie Voivodeship, in north-eastern Poland, close to the border with Belarus.
