= Bobrówka, Hajnówka County =

Bobrówka
- Village
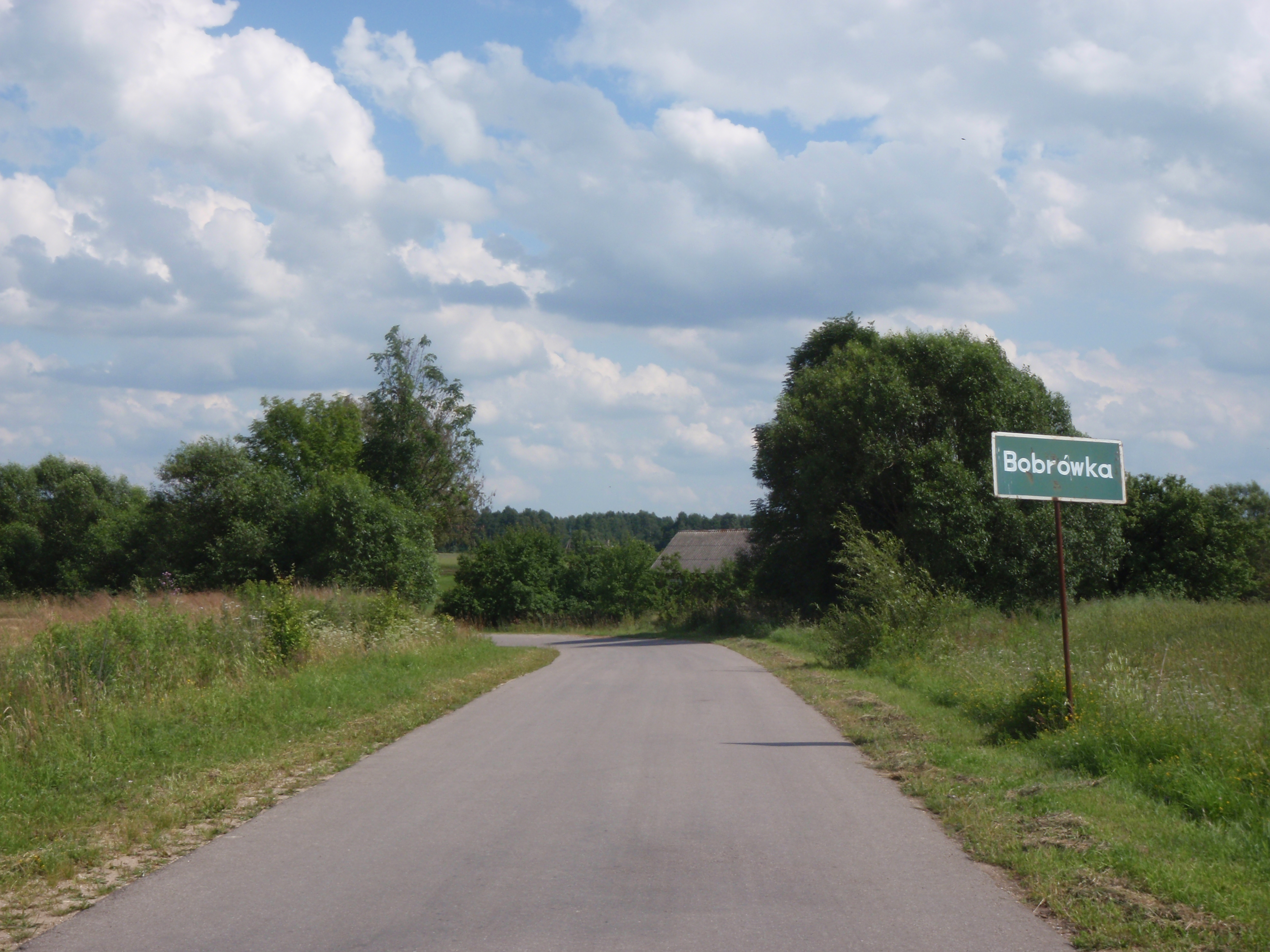
- Road sign leading to Bobrówka, Hajnówka

- Location within Poland
- Coordinates: 52°26′51″N 23°19′46″E
- Country: Poland
- Voivodeship: Podlaskie
- County: Hajnówka
- Gmina: Czeremcha

Bobrówka [bɔˈbrufka] is a village in the administrative district of Gmina Czeremcha, within Hajnówka County, Podlaskie Voivodeship, in north-eastern Poland, close to the border with Belarus.
