= Usnarz Górny =

- Village
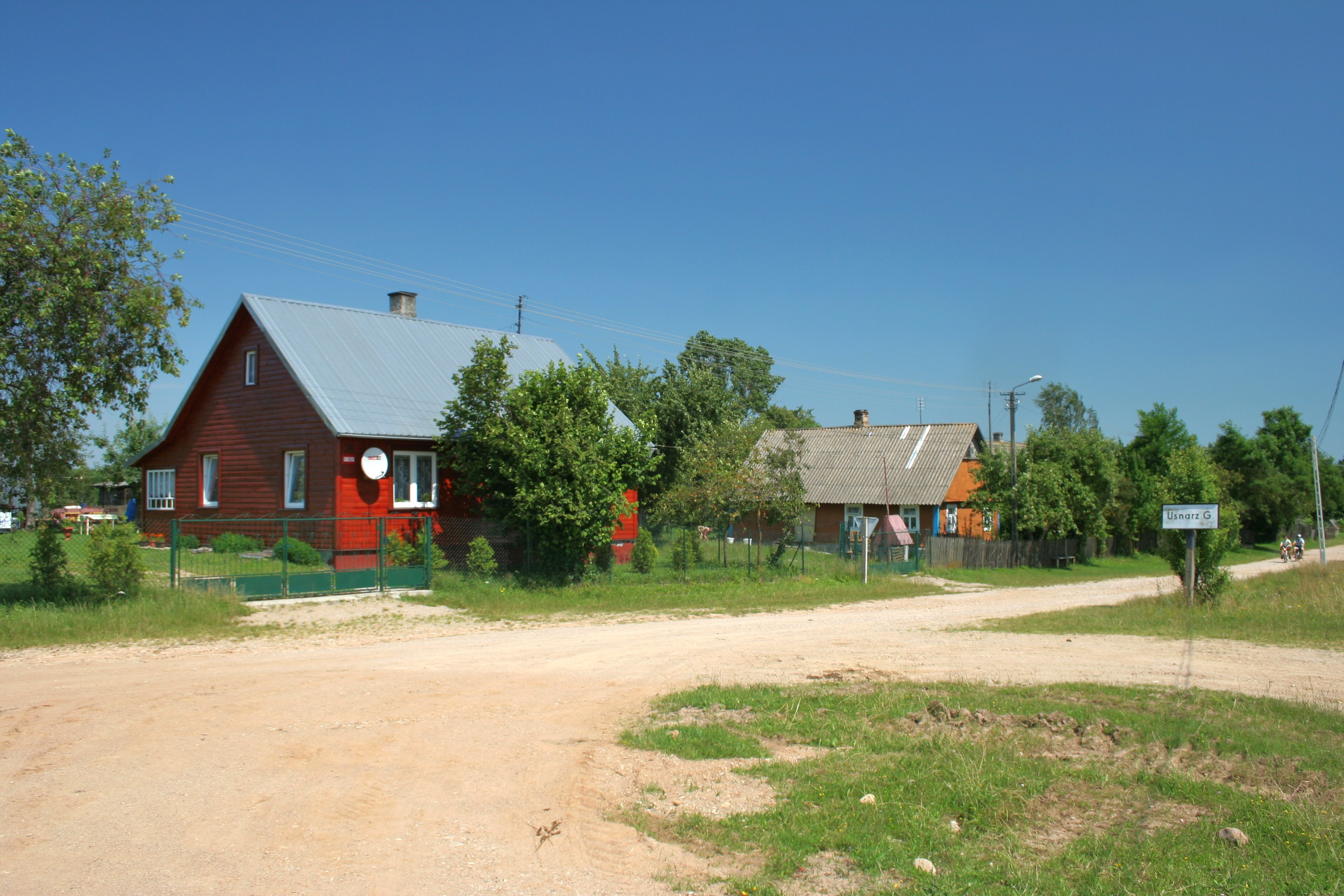
- Road into Usnarz Górny

- Location within Poland
- Coordinates: 53°20′N 23°46′E
- Country: Poland
- Voivodeship: Podlaskie
- County: Sokółka
- Gmina: Szudziałowo

Usnarz Górny [ˈusnaʐ ˈɡurnɨ] is a village in the administrative district of Gmina Szudziałowo, within Sokółka County, Podlaskie Voivodeship, in north-eastern Poland. It is situated close to the border with Belarus.

The word 'górny' in its name means 'upper', and the village just east of Usnarz Górny, on the Belarusian side of the border, is known in Polish as Usnarz Dolny ('lower Usnarz').

== History ==
Near the end of the Polish–Lithuanian Commonwealth, Usnarz Górny was owned by Kazimierz and Zuzanna Wiszczyński. From 1975 to 1998, it was part of Białystok Voivodeship.

In 2011, the village was inhabited by 75 people; most of its inhabitants are elderly. Many of its mostly wooden houses are now unoccupied, and although an asphalt road leads to the village, the roads within the village are unpaved.

In August 2021, the village was talked about in the media when a group of 32 immigrants from Afghanistan and Iraq camped for a long time near it on the Belarusian side of the border (in the khutor of Dolny Usnar), not allowed to enter Poland by the Polish border guards and military and prevented from returning to Belarus by Belarusian soldiers. They had been led to the border by the Belarusian government as part of the operation codenamed "Sluice". On October 24 of the same year, the Polish border guard reported that a group of about 60 migrants, including some of those trapped on the border since August, tried unsuccessfully to forcibly cross the border into Poland near Usnarz Górny, with the assistance of Belarusian soldiers, who tried to cut through the recently erected border fence; some of the migrants threw stones at the Polish soldiers guarding the border, two of whom were lightly injured.
