= Zaleszany, Białystok County =

Zaleszany
- Village
- Location within Poland
- Coordinates: 52°57′30″N 23°55′30″E
- Country: Poland
- Voivodeship: Podlaskie
- County: Białystok
- Gmina: Michałowo
- Population: 35

Zaleszany [zalɛˈʂanɨ] is a village in the administrative district of Gmina Michałowo, within Białystok County, Podlaskie Voivodeship, in north-eastern Poland, close to the border with Belarus.
