= Zubrzyca Mała =

- Village
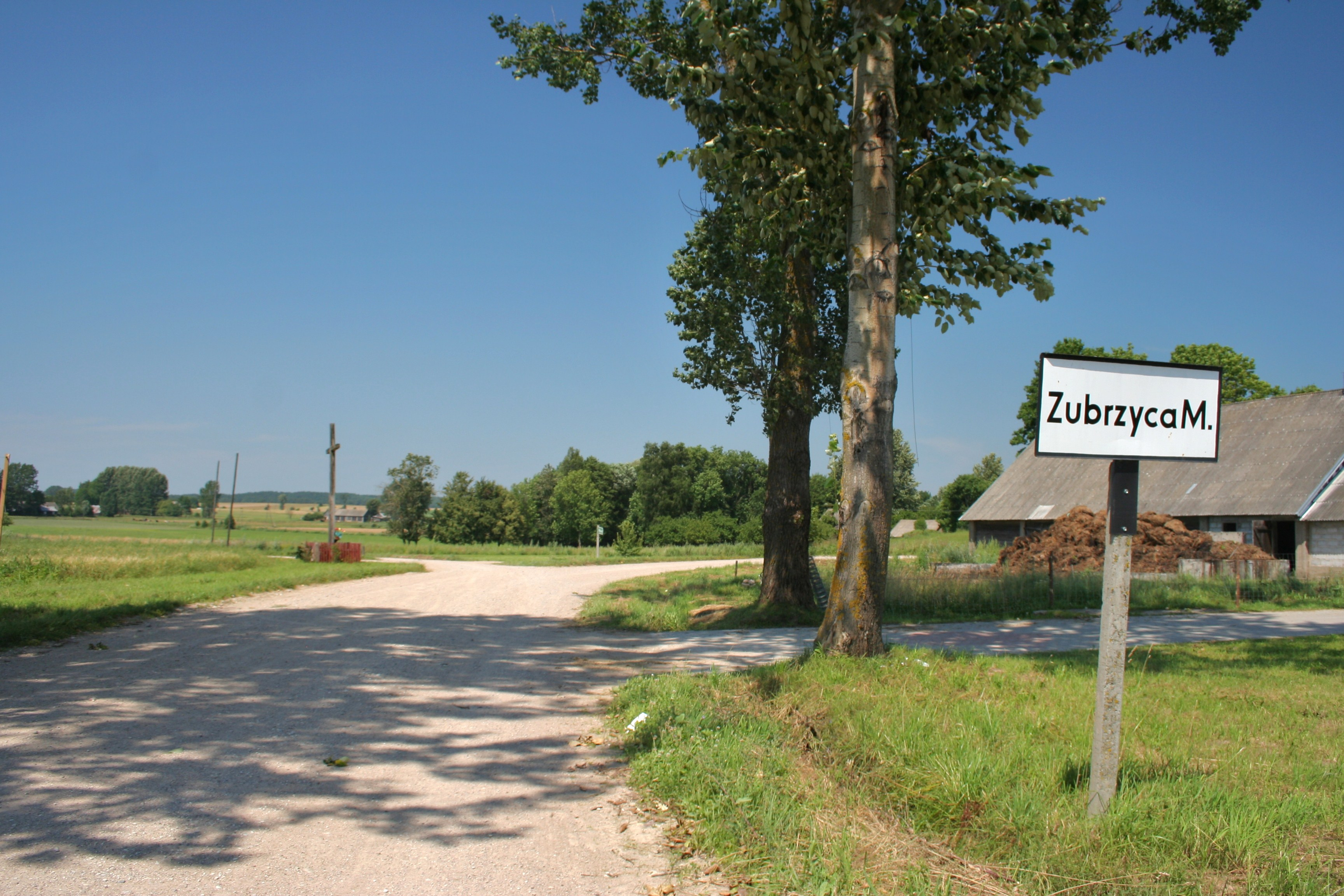
- Interactive map of Zubrzyca Mała
- Location within Poland
- Coordinates: 53°23′N 23°45′E
- Country: Poland
- Voivodeship: Podlaskie
- County: Sokółka
- Gmina: Szudziałowo

Population (2021)
  - Total: 64
- Time zone: UTC+1 (CET)
  - Summer (DST): UTC+2 (CEST)
- Postal code: 16-113
- SIMC: 0042429

Zubrzyca Mała [zuˈbʐɨt͡sa ˈmawa] is a village in the administrative district of Gmina Szudziałowo, within Sokółka County, Podlaskie Voivodeship, in north-eastern Poland, close to the border with Belarus.

== History ==
Three Polish citizens were murdered by Nazi Germany in the village during World War II.
