= Rogacze =

- Village
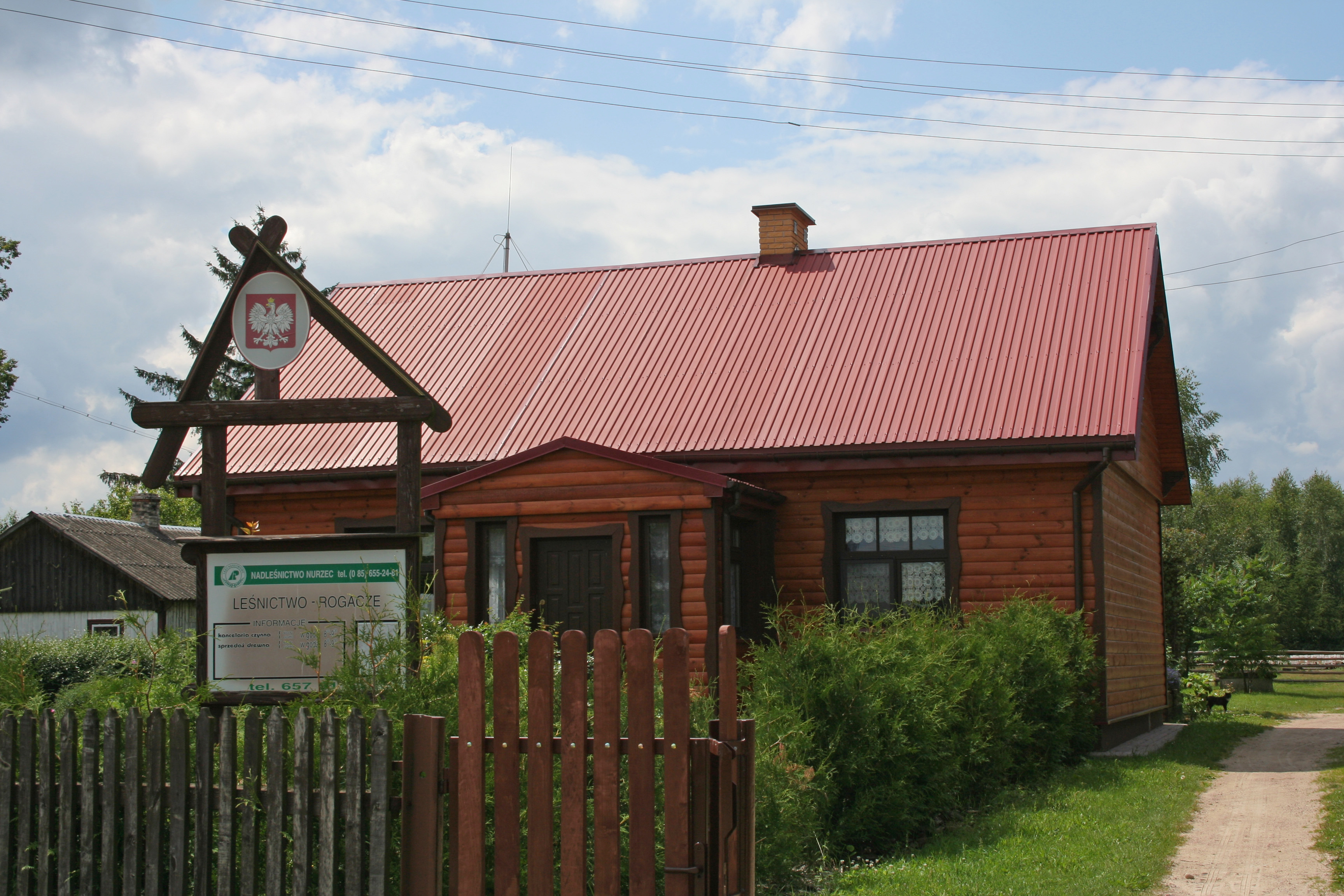
- Forestry in Rogacze

- Location within Poland
- Coordinates: 52°31′N 23°14′E
- Country: Poland
- Voivodeship: Podlaskie
- County: Siemiatycze
- Gmina: Milejczyce
- Time zone: UTC+1 (CET)
  - Summer (DST): UTC+2 (CEST)
- Vehicle registration: BSI

Rogacze [rɔˈɡat͡ʂɛ] is a village in the administrative district of Gmina Milejczyce, within Siemiatycze County, Podlaskie Voivodeship, in eastern Poland. It is situated on the Nurczyk River.

According to the 1921 census, the village was inhabited by 299 people, among whom 12 were Roman Catholic, 264 Orthodox, and 23 Jewish. At the same time, 19 inhabitants declared Polish nationality, 255 Belarusian and 16 Jewish. There were 54 residential buildings in the village.
