= Stare Trzciano =

- Village
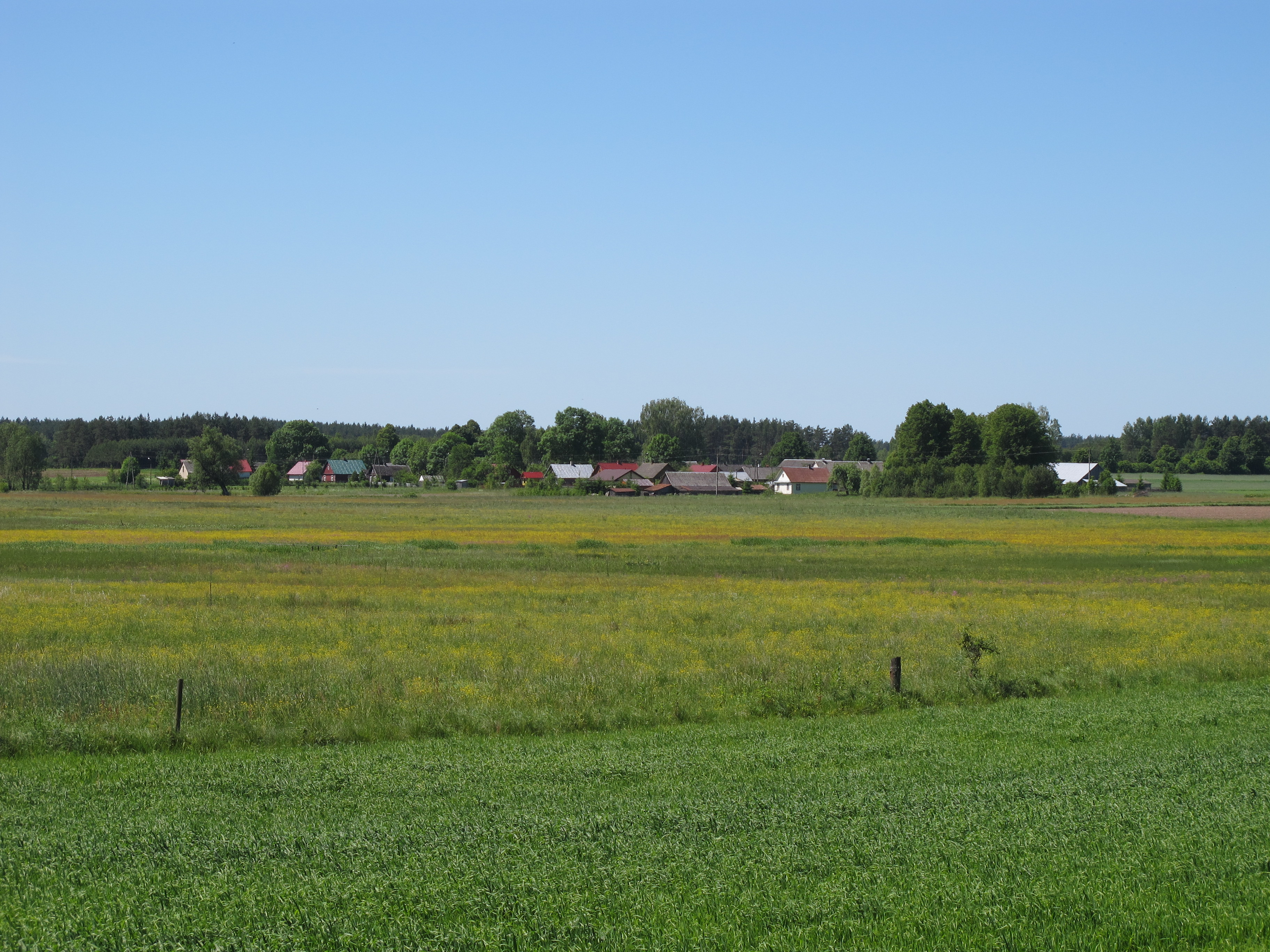

- Location within Poland
- Coordinates: 53°15′56″N 23°35′7″E
- Country: Poland
- Voivodeship: Podlaskie
- County: Sokółka
- Gmina: Szudziałowo
- Population: 10

Stare Trzciano [ˈstarɛ ˈtʂt͡ɕanɔ] is a village in the administrative district of Gmina Szudziałowo, within Sokółka County, Podlaskie Voivodeship, in north-eastern Poland, close to the border with Belarus.
