= Grodzisko, Podlaskie Voivodeship =

Grodzisko
- Village
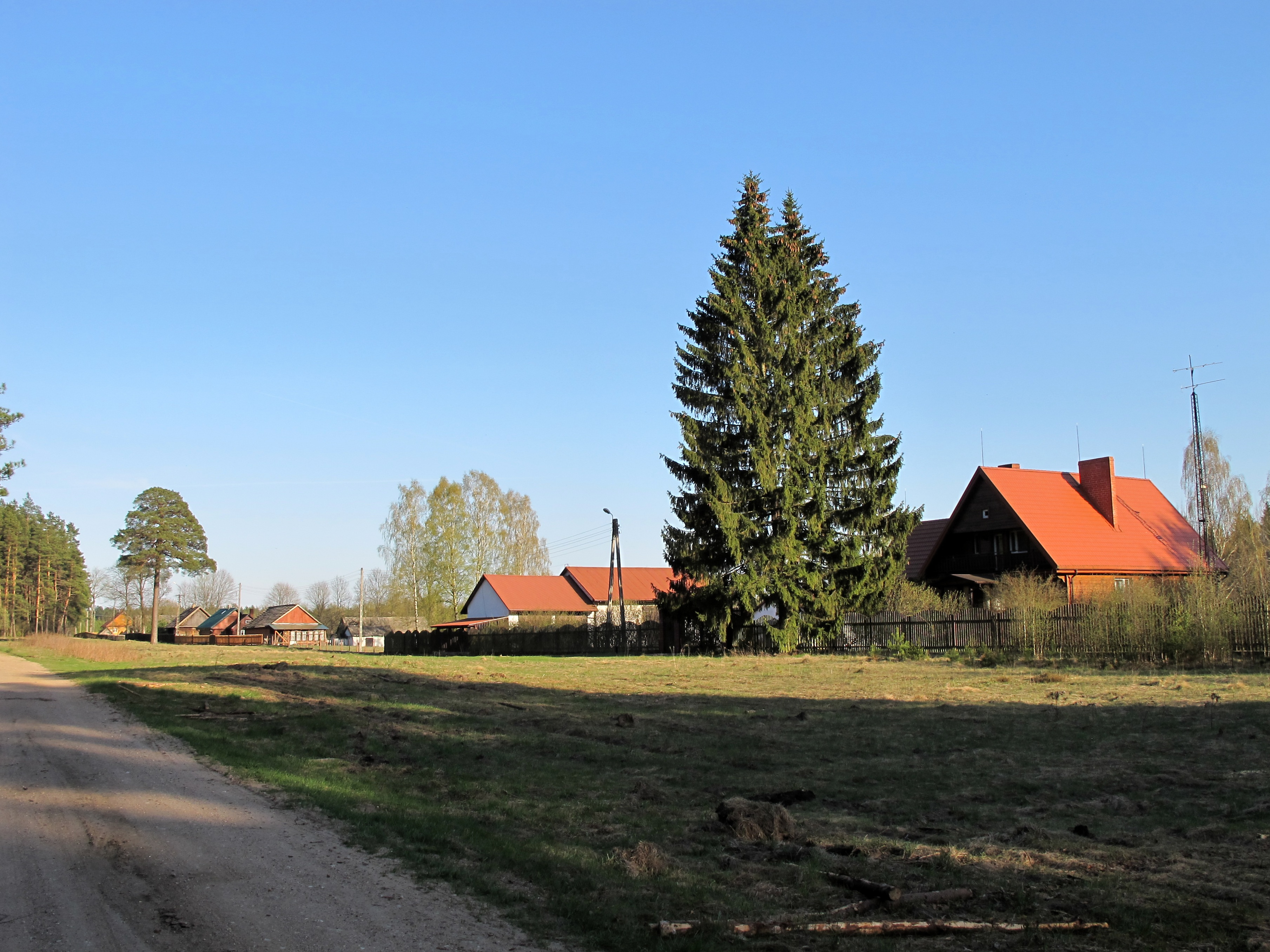

- Location within Poland
- Coordinates: 53°19′25″N 23°30′12″E
- Country: Poland
- Voivodeship: Podlaskie
- County: Sokółka
- Gmina: Szudziałowo

Grodzisko [ɡrɔˈd͡ʑiskɔ] is a village in the administrative district of Gmina Szudziałowo, within Sokółka County, Podlaskie Voivodeship, in north-eastern Poland, close to the border with Belarus.
