= Słoja =

- Village
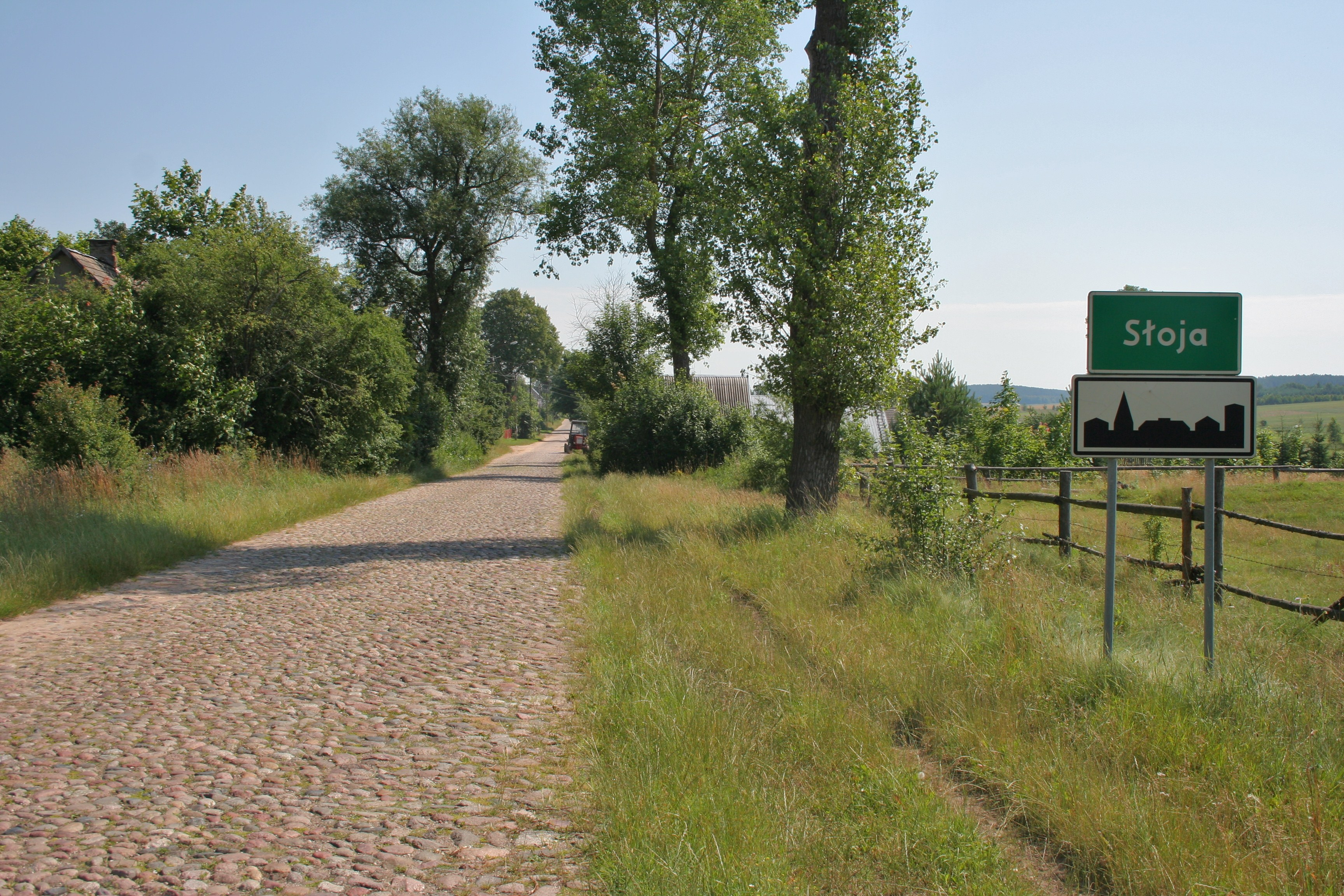

- Location within Poland
- Coordinates: 53°20′N 23°39′E
- Country: Poland
- Voivodeship: Podlaskie
- County: Sokółka
- Gmina: Szudziałowo
- Time zone: UTC+1 (CET)
  - Summer (DST): UTC+2 (CEST)

Słoja [ˈswɔja] is a village in the administrative district of Gmina Szudziałowo, within Sokółka County, Podlaskie Voivodeship, in north-eastern Poland, close to the border with Belarus.

== History ==
Three Polish citizens were murdered by Nazi Germany in the village during World War II.
