= Klin-Gajówka =

Village in Gmina Szudziałowo, Poland

- Village
- Location within Poland
- Coordinates: 53°16′05″N 23°33′27″E
- Country: Poland
- Voivodeship: Podlaskie
- County: Sokółka
- Gmina: Szudziałowo

Klin-Gajówka [ˈklin ɡaˈjufka] is a village in the administrative district of Gmina Szudziałowo, within Sokółka County, Podlaskie Voivodeship, in north-eastern Poland, close to the border with Belarus.
