= Łaźnisko =

- Village
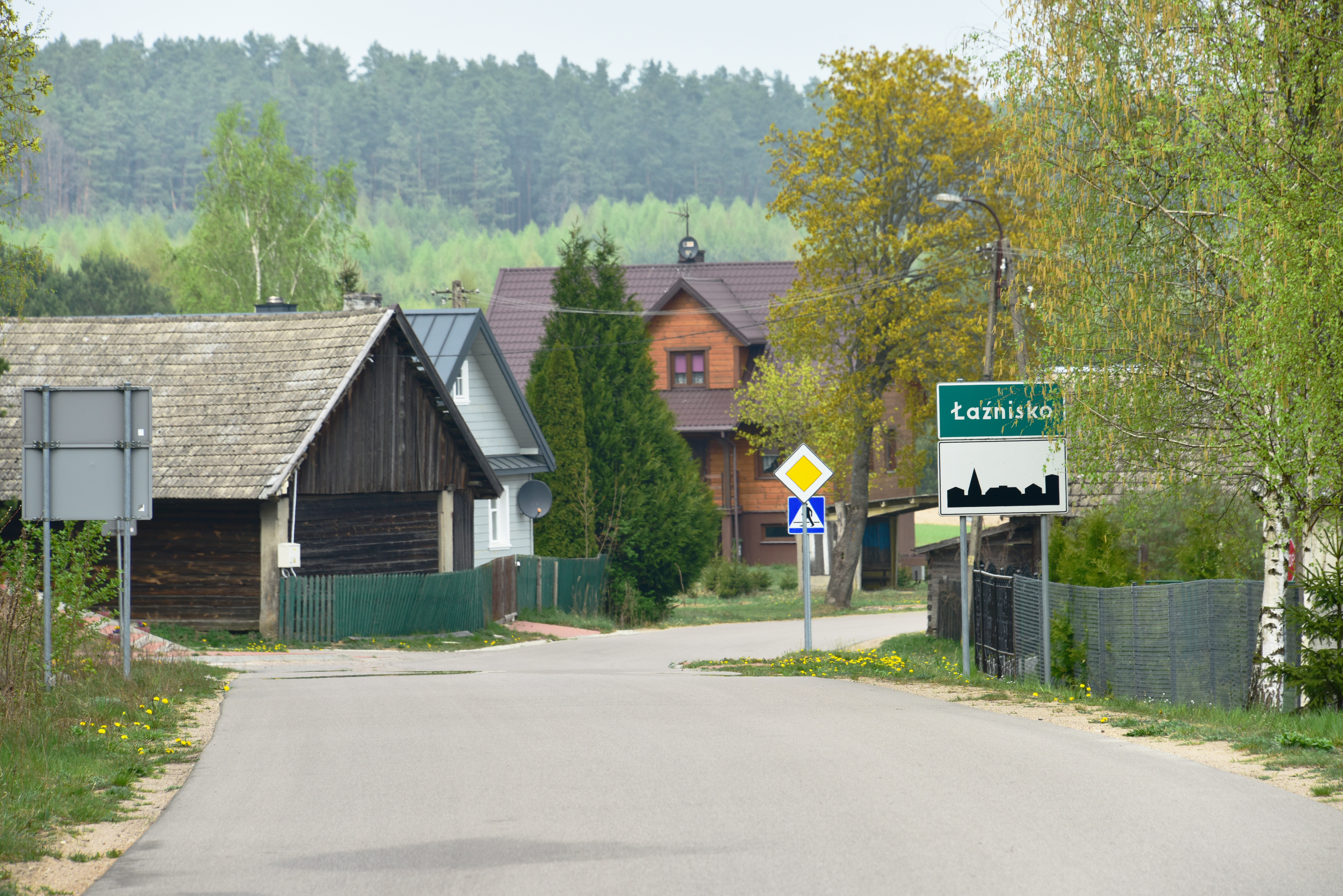
- View of the village in 2019

- Location within Poland
- Coordinates: 53°17′46″N 23°30′12″E
- Country: Poland
- Voivodeship: Podlaskie
- County: Sokółka
- Gmina: Szudziałowo

Łaźnisko [waʑˈniskɔ] is a village in the administrative district of Gmina Szudziałowo, within Sokółka County, Podlaskie Voivodeship, in north-eastern Poland, close to the border with Belarus.
