= Rowek =

- Village
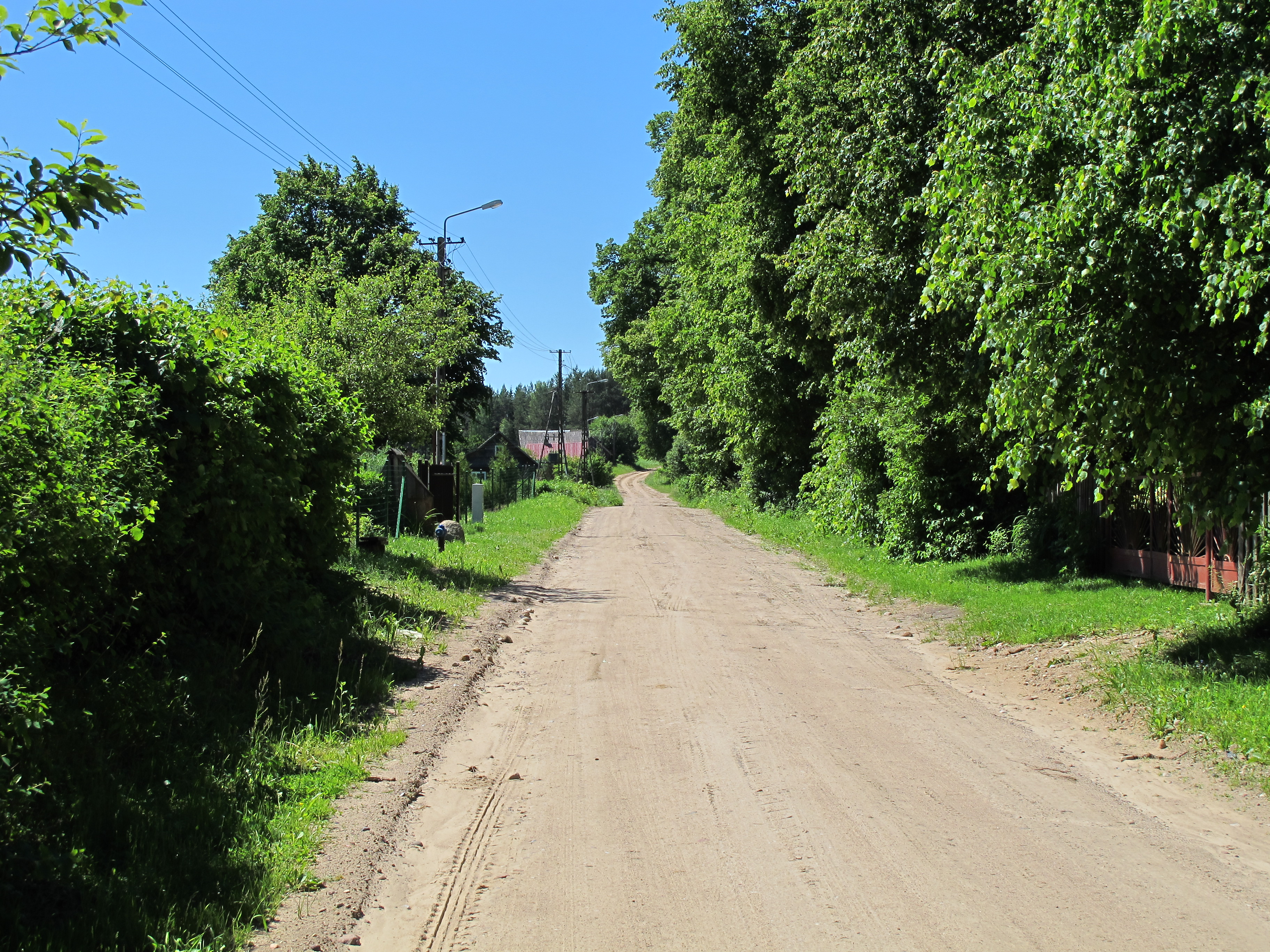
- Street of Rowek

- Location within Poland
- Coordinates: 53°16′55″N 23°34′19″E
- Country: Poland
- Voivodeship: Podlaskie
- County: Sokółka
- Gmina: Szudziałowo

Rowek [ˈrɔvɛk] is a village in the administrative district of Gmina Szudziałowo, within Sokółka County, Podlaskie Voivodeship, in north-eastern Poland, close to the border with Belarus.
