= Biały Ług, Podlaskie Voivodeship =

Biały Ług
- Village
- Location within Poland
- Coordinates: 53°16′58″N 23°37′19″E
- Country: Poland
- Voivodeship: Podlaskie
- County: Sokółka
- Gmina: Szudziałowo

Biały Ług [ˈbjawɨ ˈwuk] is a village in the administrative district of Gmina Szudziałowo, within Sokółka County, Podlaskie Voivodeship, in north-eastern Poland, close to the border with Belarus.
