= Słójka-Borowszczyzna =

- Village
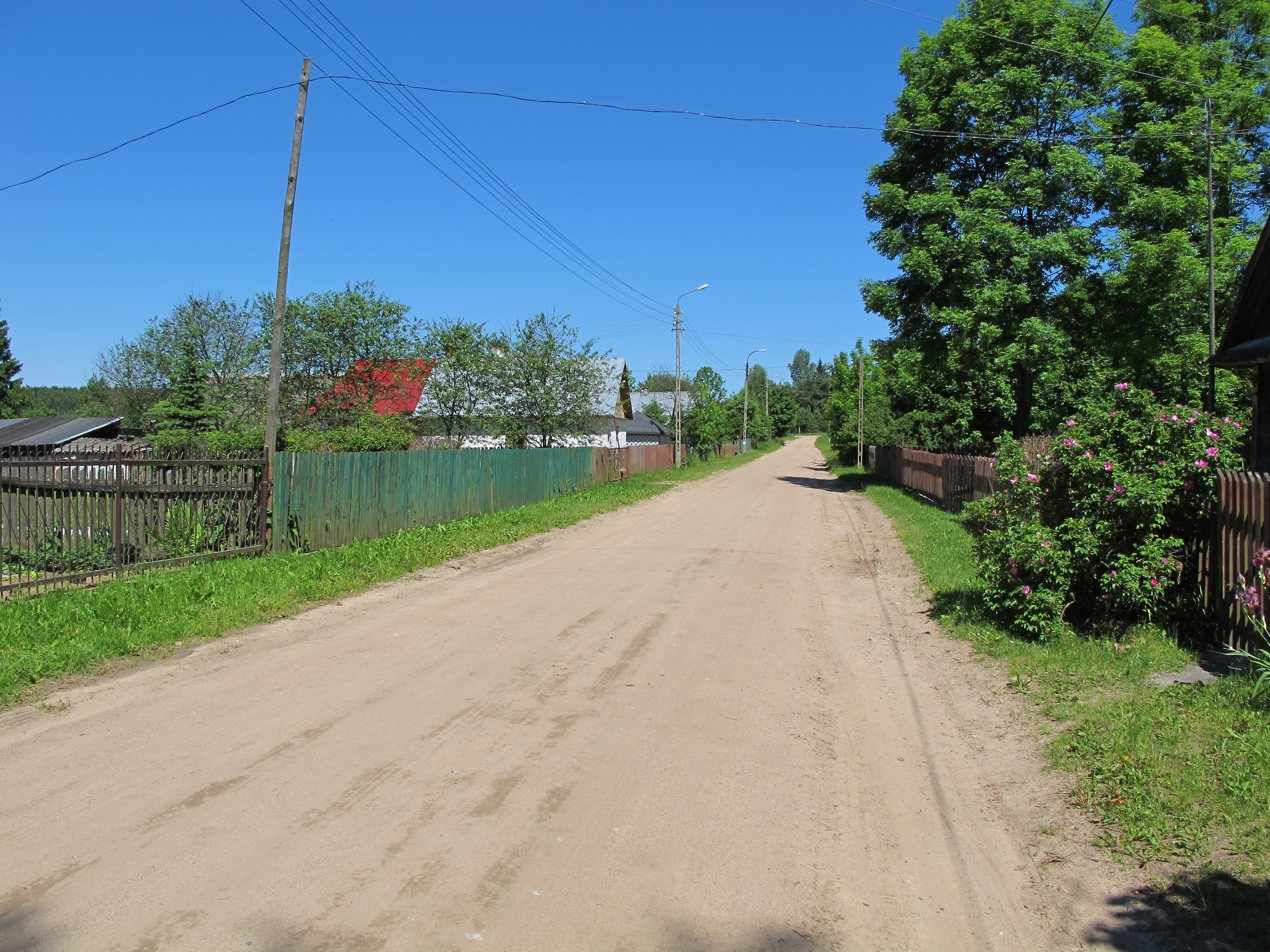
- Street of Słójka-Borowszczyzna

- Location within Poland
- Coordinates: 53°16′30″N 23°35′39″E
- Country: Poland
- Voivodeship: Podlaskie
- County: Sokółka
- Gmina: Szudziałowo

Słójka-Borowszczyzna [ˈswui̯ka bɔrɔfʂˈt͡ʂɨzna] is a village in the administrative district of Gmina Szudziałowo, within Sokółka County, Podlaskie Voivodeship, in north-eastern Poland, close to the border with Belarus.
