= Samogród =

- Village
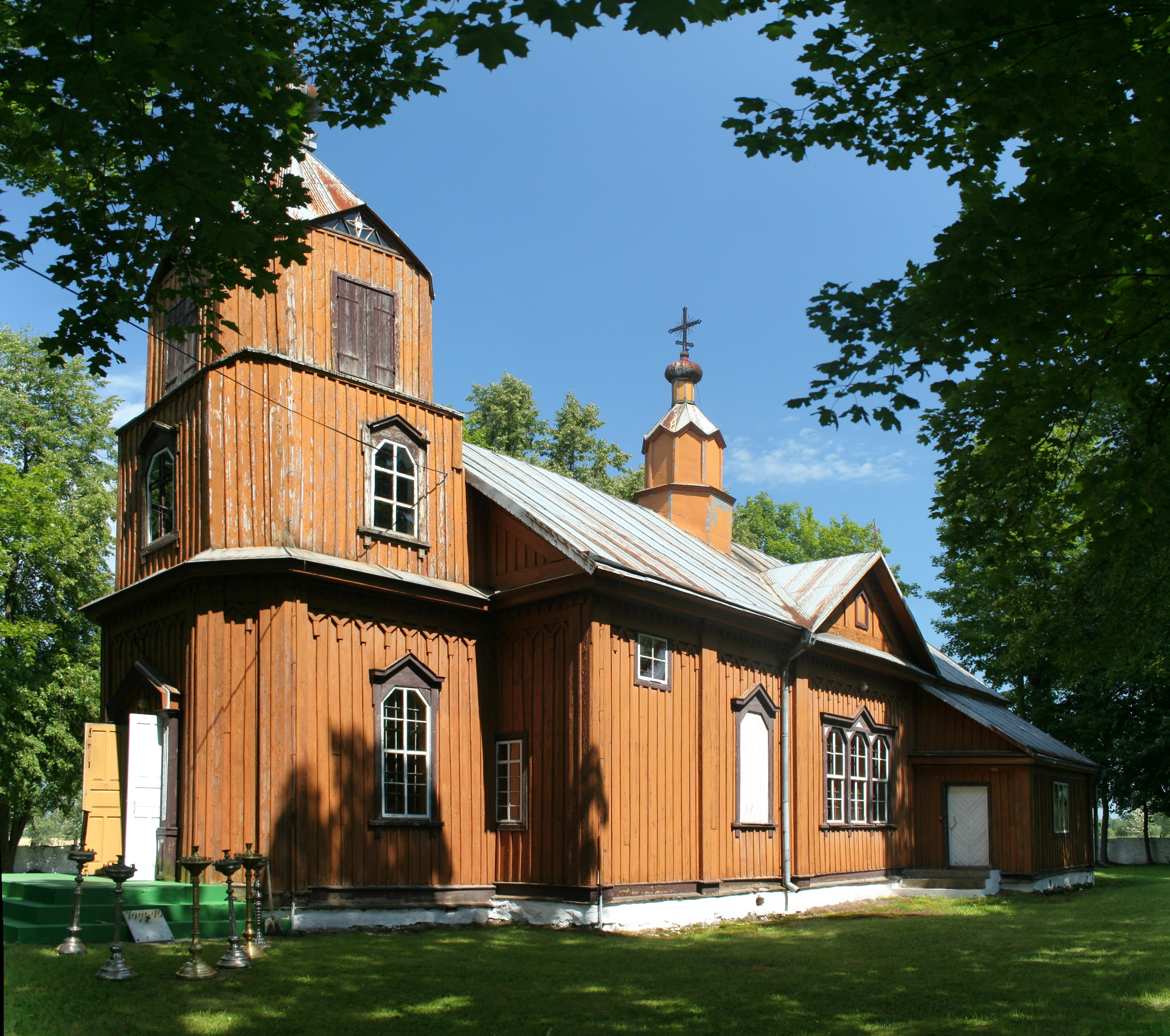

- Location within Poland
- Coordinates: 53°21′27.07″N 23°40′59.05″E
- Country: Poland
- Voivodeship: Podlaskie
- County: Sokółka
- Gmina: Szudziałowo

Samogród [saˈmɔɡrut] is a village in the administrative district of Gmina Szudziałowo, within Sokółka County, Podlaskie Voivodeship, in north-eastern Poland, close to the border with Belarus.
