= Nowe Trzciano =

- Village
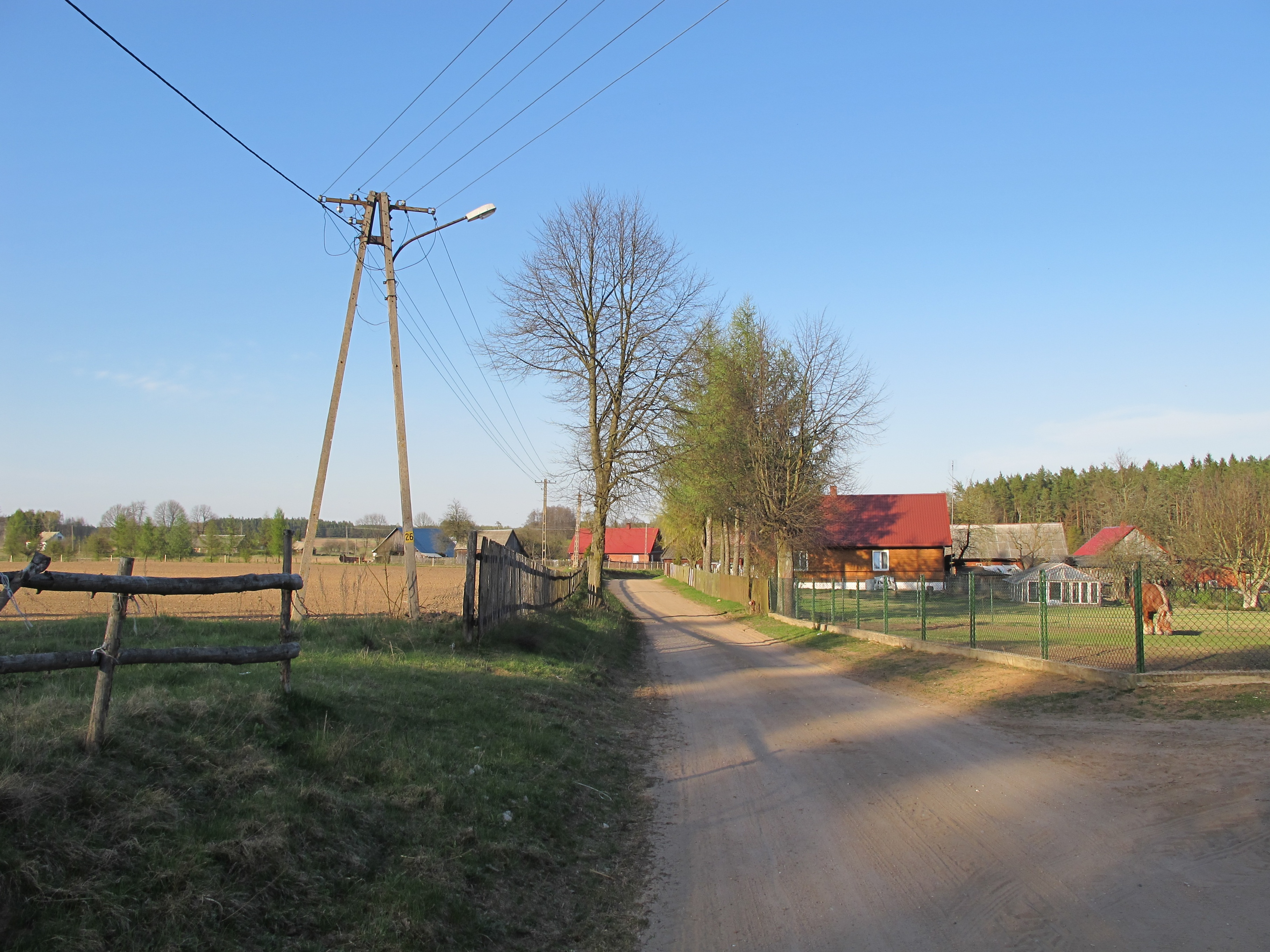
- Street of Nowe Trzciano

- Location within Poland
- Coordinates: 53°15′22″N 23°33′40″E
- Country: Poland
- Voivodeship: Podlaskie
- County: Sokółka
- Gmina: Szudziałowo

Nowe Trzciano [ˈnɔvɛ ˈtʂt͡ɕanɔ] is a village in the administrative district of Gmina Szudziałowo, within Sokółka County, Podlaskie Voivodeship, in north-eastern Poland, close to the border with Belarus.
