= Litwinowy Ług =

- Village
- Location within Poland
- Coordinates: 53°19′02″N 23°30′02″E
- Country: Poland
- Voivodeship: Podlaskie
- County: Sokółka
- Gmina: Szudziałowo

Litwinowy Ług [litfiˈnɔvɨ ˈwuk] is a village in the administrative district of Gmina Szudziałowo, in Sokółka County, Podlaskie Voivodeship, in north-eastern Poland, near the border with Belarus.
