= Nowinka, Gmina Szudziałowo =

Nowinka
- Village
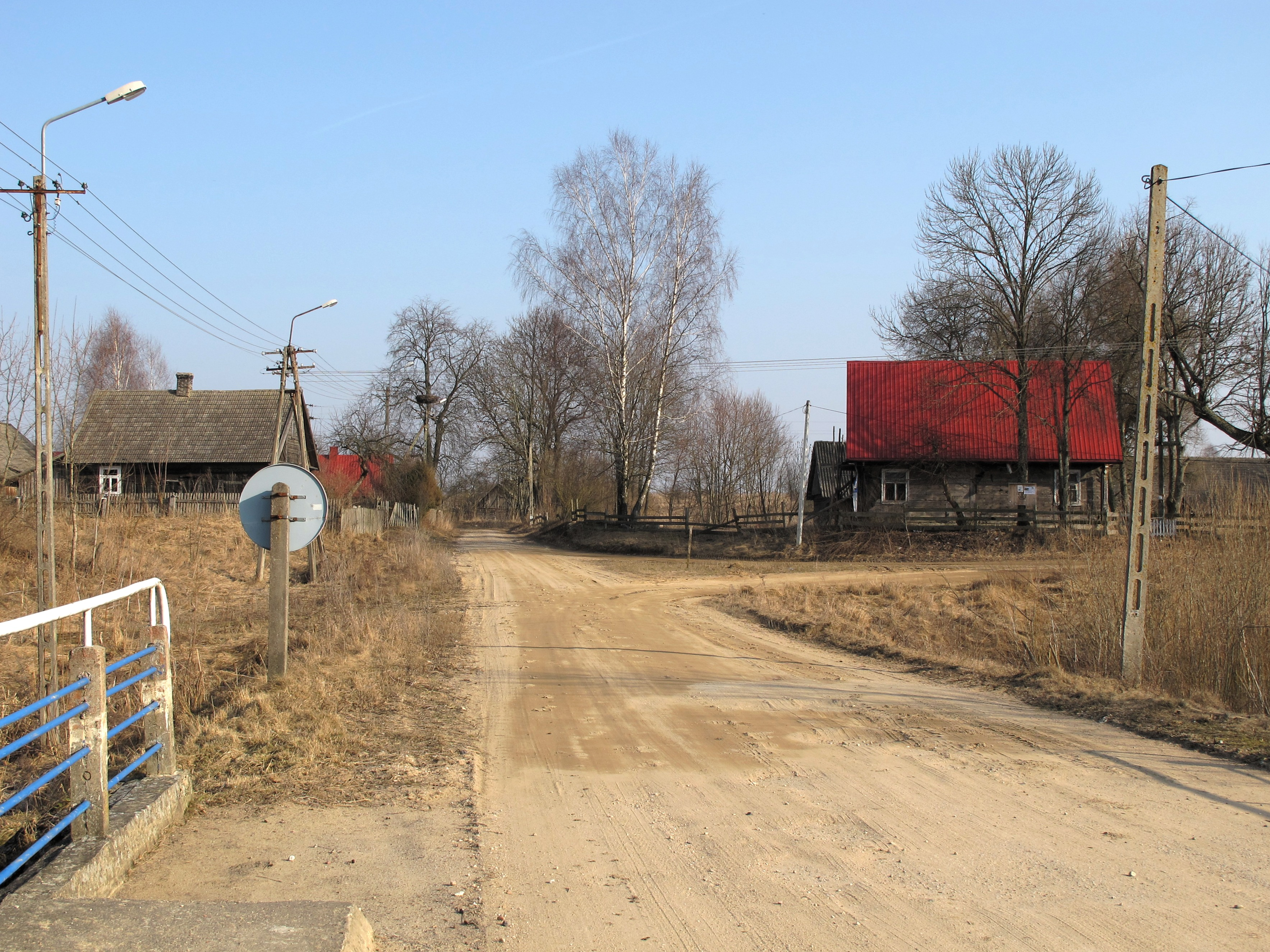

- Location within Poland
- Coordinates: 53°17′46″N 23°37′14″E
- Country: Poland
- Voivodeship: Podlaskie
- County: Sokółka
- Gmina: Szudziałowo
- Population: 100

Nowinka [nɔˈviŋka] is a village in the administrative district of Gmina Szudziałowo, within Sokółka County, Podlaskie Voivodeship, in north-eastern Poland, close to the border with Belarus.
