= Wierzchlesie =

- Village
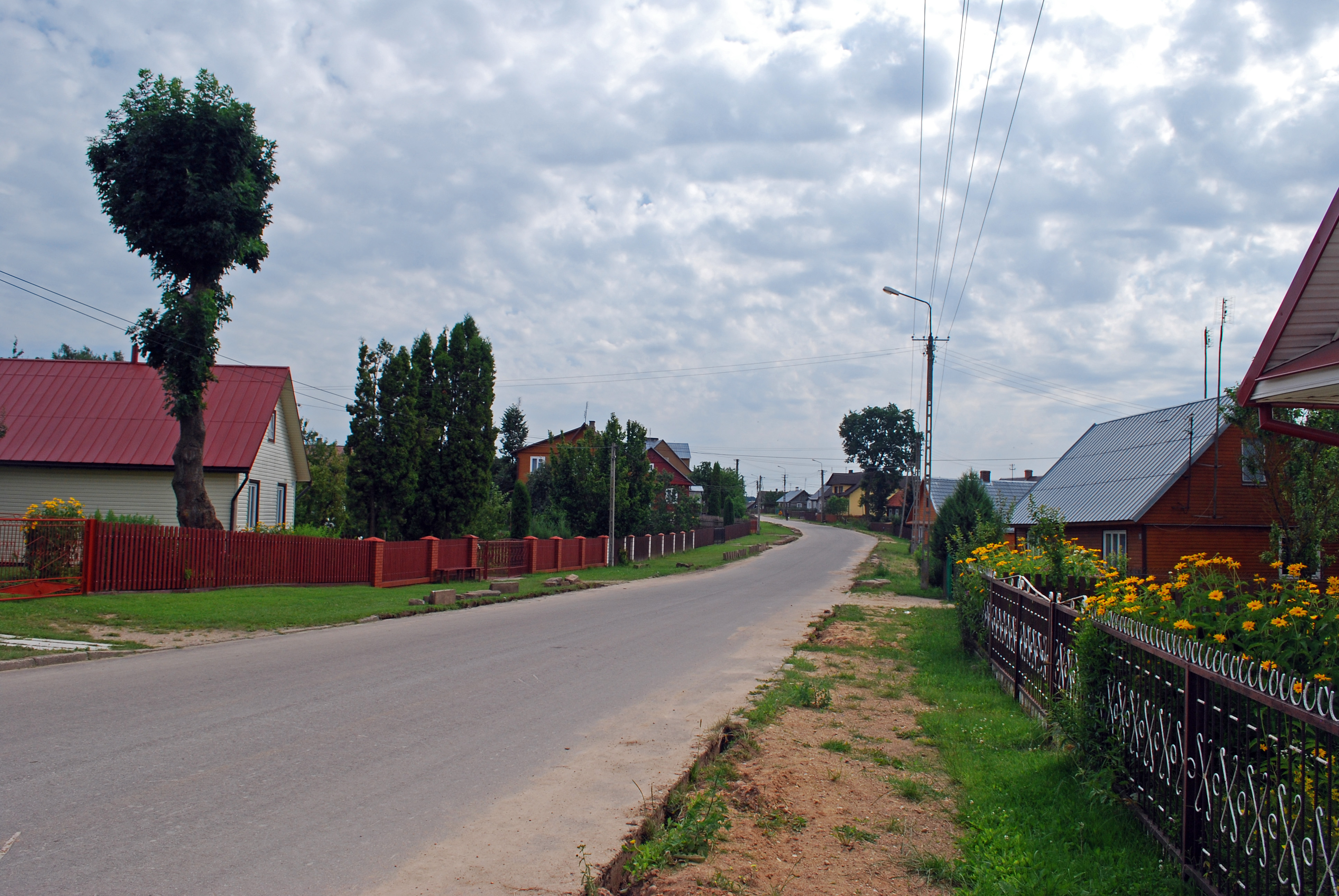
- Street in Wierzchlesie

- Location within Poland
- Coordinates: 53°19′N 23°33′E
- Country: Poland
- Voivodeship: Podlaskie
- County: Sokółka
- Gmina: Szudziałowo
- Population: 250

Wierzchlesie [vjɛʂˈxlɛɕɛ] is a village in the administrative district of Gmina Szudziałowo, within Sokółka County, Podlaskie Voivodeship, in north-eastern Poland, close to the border with Belarus.
