= Knyszewicze =

- Village
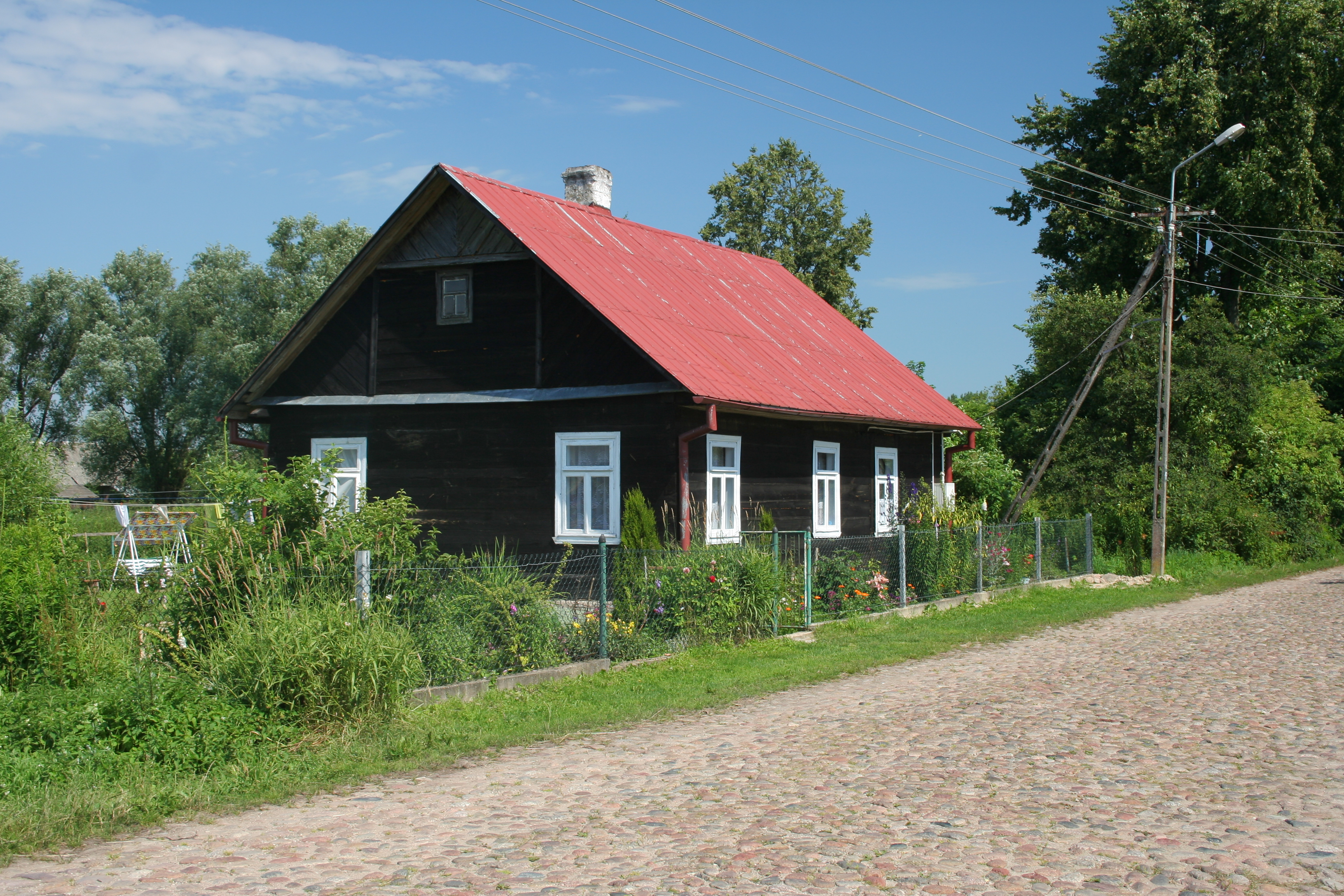

- Location within Poland
- Coordinates: 53°20′N 23°40′E
- Country: Poland
- Voivodeship: Podlaskie
- County: Sokółka
- Gmina: Szudziałowo
- Postal code: 16-113
- Vehicle registration: BSK

Knyszewicze [knɨʂɛˈvit͡ʂɛ] is a village in the administrative district of Gmina Szudziałowo, within Sokółka County, Podlaskie Voivodeship, in north-eastern Poland, close to the border with Belarus.

Five Polish citizens were murdered by Nazi Germany in the village during World War II.
