= Chmielowszczyzna-Kolonia =

- Village
- Location within Poland
- Coordinates: 53°21′31″N 23°39′21″E
- Country: Poland
- Voivodeship: Podlaskie
- County: Sokółka
- Gmina: Szudziałowo

Chmielowszczyzna-Kolonia [xmjɛlɔfʂˈt͡ʂɨzna kɔˈlɔɲa] is a village in the administrative district of Gmina Szudziałowo, within Sokółka County, Podlaskie Voivodeship, in north-eastern Poland. It is near the border with Belarus.
