= Klin, Podlaskie Voivodeship =

Klin
- Village
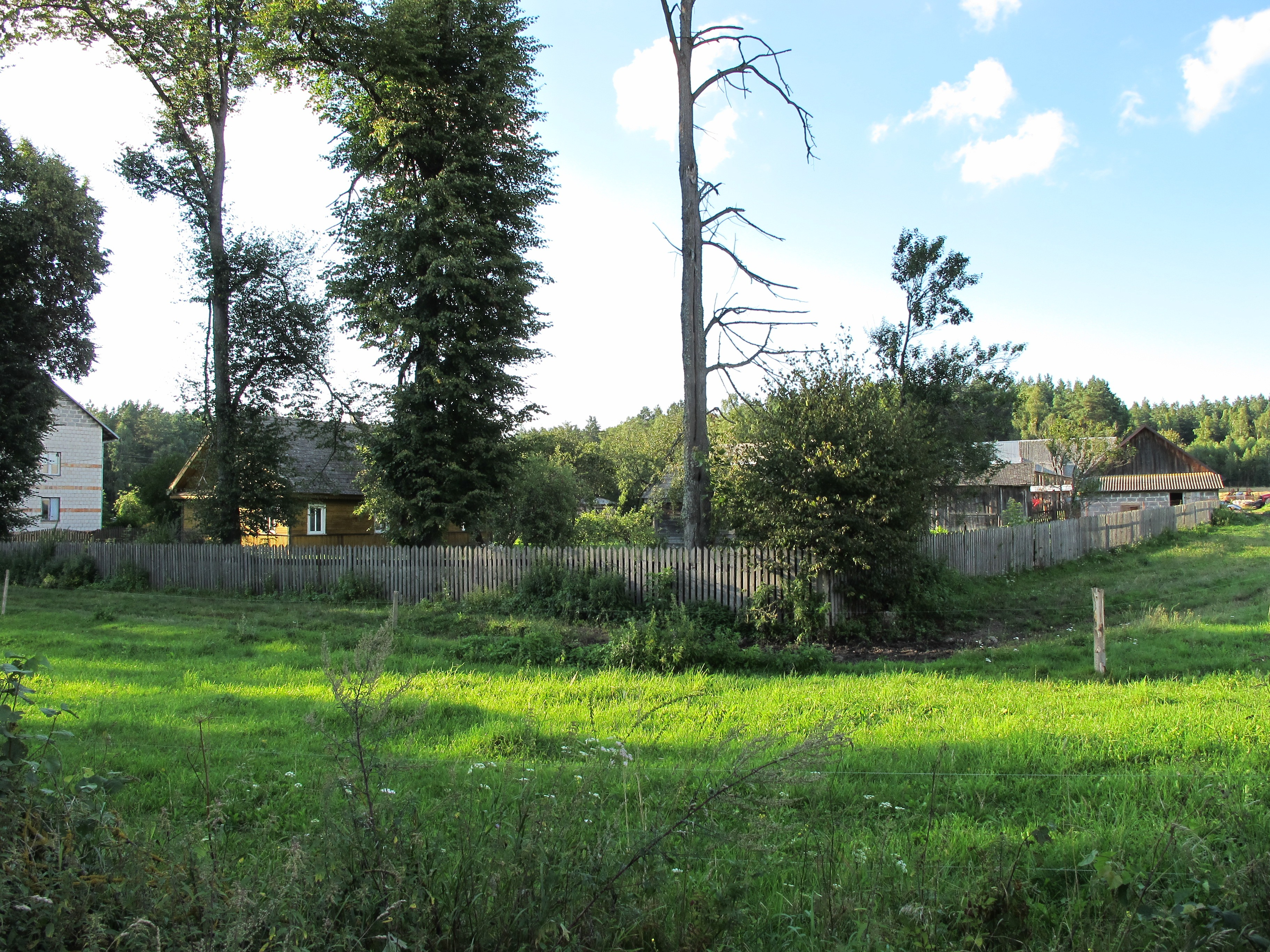
- Street of Klin, Podlaskie Voivodeship

- Location within Poland
- Coordinates: 53°16′09″N 23°33′57″E
- Country: Poland
- Voivodeship: Podlaskie
- County: Sokółka
- Gmina: Szudziałowo

Klin [klin] is a village in the administrative district of Gmina Szudziałowo, within Sokółka County, Podlaskie Voivodeship, in north-eastern Poland, close to the border with Belarus.
