= Suchynicze =

- Village
- Location within Poland
- Coordinates: 53°22′N 23°40′E
- Country: Poland
- Voivodeship: Podlaskie
- County: Sokółka
- Gmina: Szudziałowo

Suchynicze [suxɨˈnit͡ʂɛ] is a village in the administrative district of Gmina Szudziałowo, within Sokółka County, Podlaskie Voivodeship, in north-eastern Poland, close to the border with Belarus.
