= Poczopek =

- Village
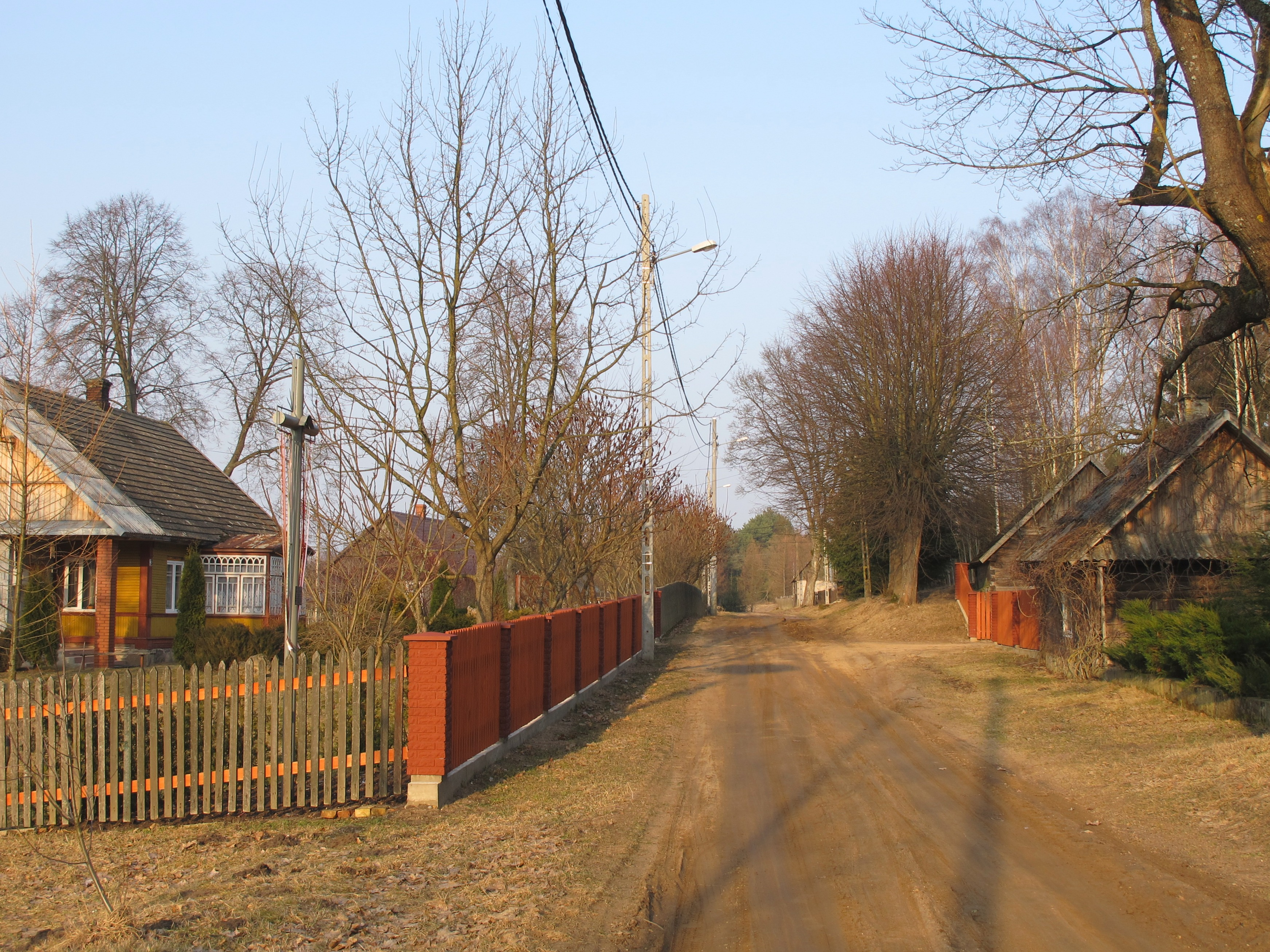

- Location within Poland
- Coordinates: 53°15′43″N 23°38′09″E
- Country: Poland
- Voivodeship: Podlaskie
- County: Sokółka
- Gmina: Szudziałowo

Poczopek [pɔˈt͡ʂɔpɛk] is a village in the administrative district of Gmina Szudziałowo, within Sokółka County, Podlaskie Voivodeship, in north-eastern Poland, close to the border with Belarus.
