= Knyszewicze Małe =

Village in Gmina Szudziałowo, Poland

- Village
- Location within Poland
- Coordinates: 53°20′05″N 23°39′00″E
- Country: Poland
- Voivodeship: Podlaskie
- County: Sokółka
- Gmina: Szudziałowo

Knyszewicze Małe [knɨʂɛˈvit͡ʂɛ ˈmawɛ] is a village in the administrative district of Gmina Szudziałowo, within Sokółka County, Podlaskie Voivodeship, in north-eastern Poland, close to the border with Belarus.
