= Nowy Ostrów, Podlaskie Voivodeship =

Nowy Ostrów
- Village
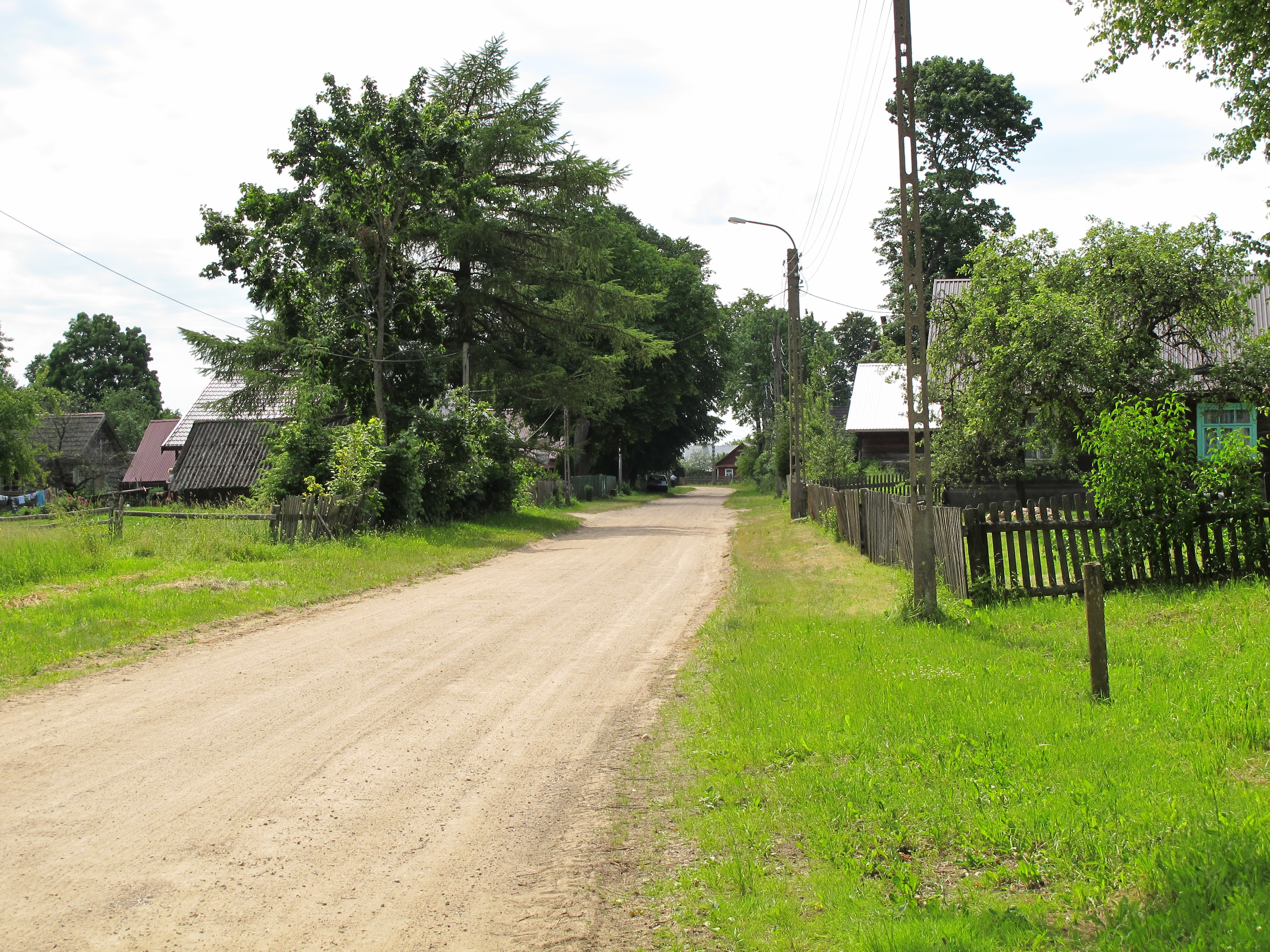

- Location within Poland
- Coordinates: 53°14′29″N 23°39′29″E
- Country: Poland
- Voivodeship: Podlaskie
- County: Sokółka
- Gmina: Szudziałowo

Population
  - Total: 160
- Postal code: 16-113
- Vehicle registration: BSK

Nowy Ostrów [ˈnɔvɨ ˈɔstruf] is a village in the administrative district of Gmina Szudziałowo, within Sokółka County, Podlaskie Voivodeship, in north-eastern Poland, close to the border with Belarus.

Four Polish citizens were murdered by Nazi Germany in the village during World War II.
