= Aleksandrówka, Gmina Szudziałowo =

Aleksandrówka
- Village
- Location within Poland
- Coordinates: 53°17′0″N 23°44′36″E
- Country: Poland
- Voivodeship: Podlaskie
- County: Sokółka
- Gmina: Szudziałowo

Aleksandrówka [alɛksanˈdrufka] is a village in the administrative district of Gmina Szudziałowo, within Sokółka County, Podlaskie Voivodeship, in north-eastern Poland, close to the border with Belarus.
