= Wiktor Tołkin =

Polish sculptor and architect

- Wiktor Tołkin
- Born: February 21, 1922; Tołkacze, Poland
- Died: May 7, 2013 (aged 91); Warsaw, Poland
- Citizenship: Polish
- Occupation: Sculptor
- Known for: Monumental memorial sculpture

Wiktor Tołkin (February 21, 1922 in Tołkacze, Poland – May 7, 2013) was a Polish sculptor and architect. A member of the Armia Krajowa resistance during World War II; he was arrested by the Gestapo, and incarcerated at Auschwitz from November 17, 1942, to February 1944. During this period Tołkin survived a death march to Stalag at Sandbostel.

== Work ==
Tołkin graduated from two universities, the Gdańsk Polytechnic, and the Academy of Fine Arts in Gdańsk, to become one of the more influential Polish artists of the 1960s. He is best known for his monumental sculptures built in memory of the victims of the German concentration camps in Stutthof and Majdanek. His most recognized works are abstract forms of colored concrete with expressive form, incorporating architectural design and elements.

== Leading works ==
- Monument The Marrying of Poland with the Sea in Kolobrzeg, built November 30, 1963.
- Monument Fight and Martyrdom in the Nazi concentration camp in Stutthof, built May 12, 1968.
- Monument Fight and Martyrdom and the mausoleum-pantheon in the Nazi concentration camp in Majdanek, built in 1969.
- Fight and Martyrdom in Pawiak, Warsaw.
- Monument to the Battle of in Plock, (1978)
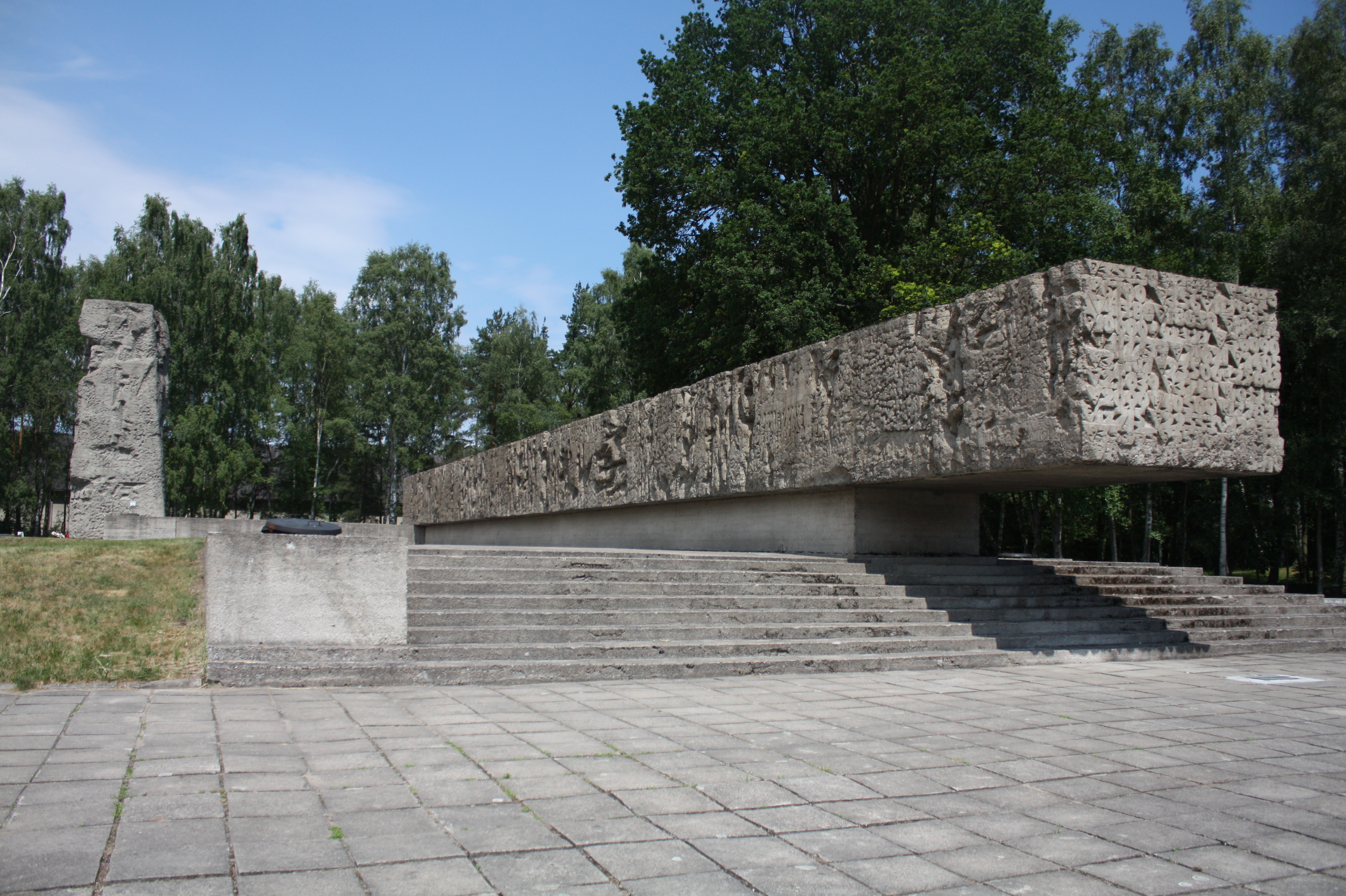
"Fight and Martyrdom", Sztutowo (Poland)

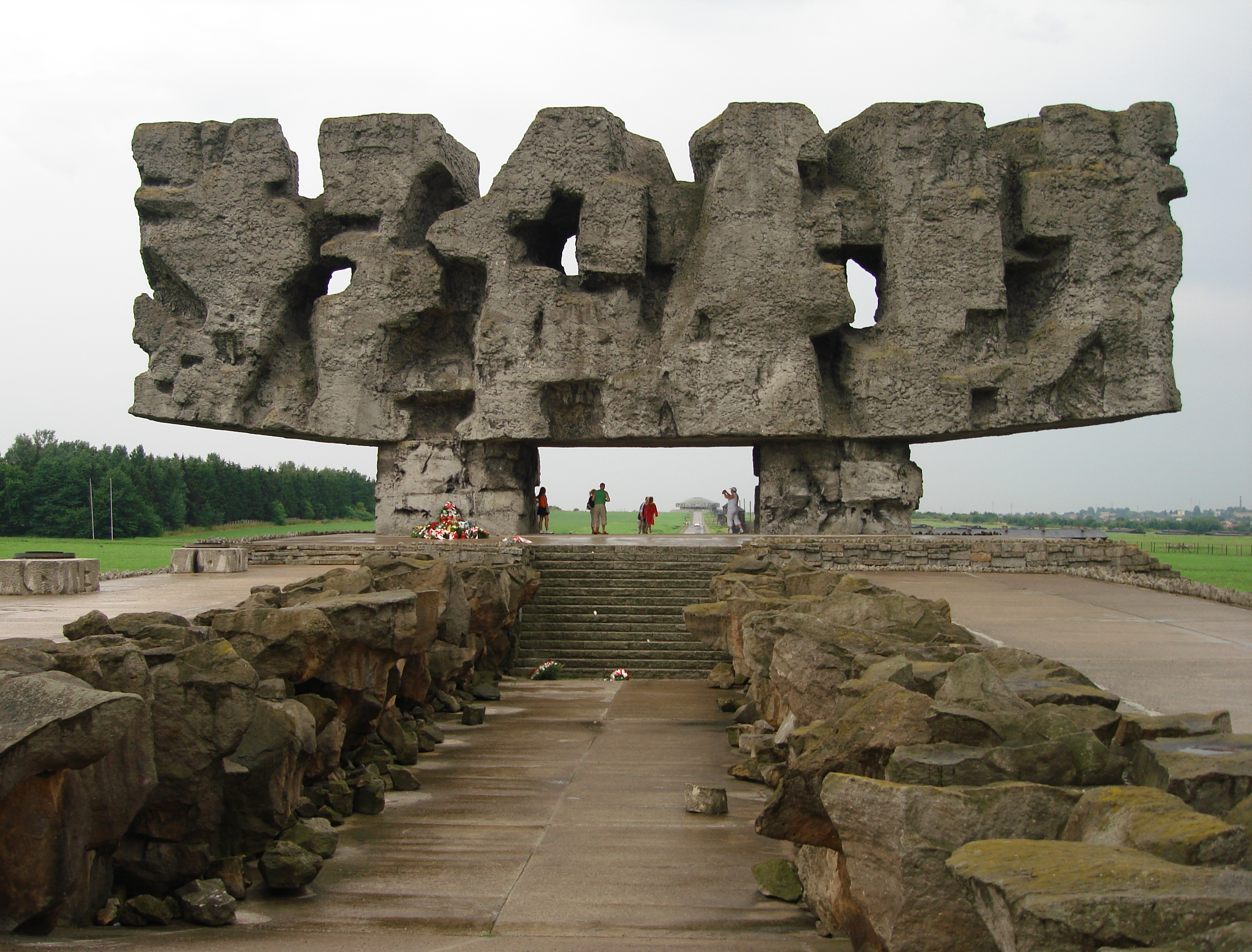
"Fight and Martyrdom", Majdanek (Poland)

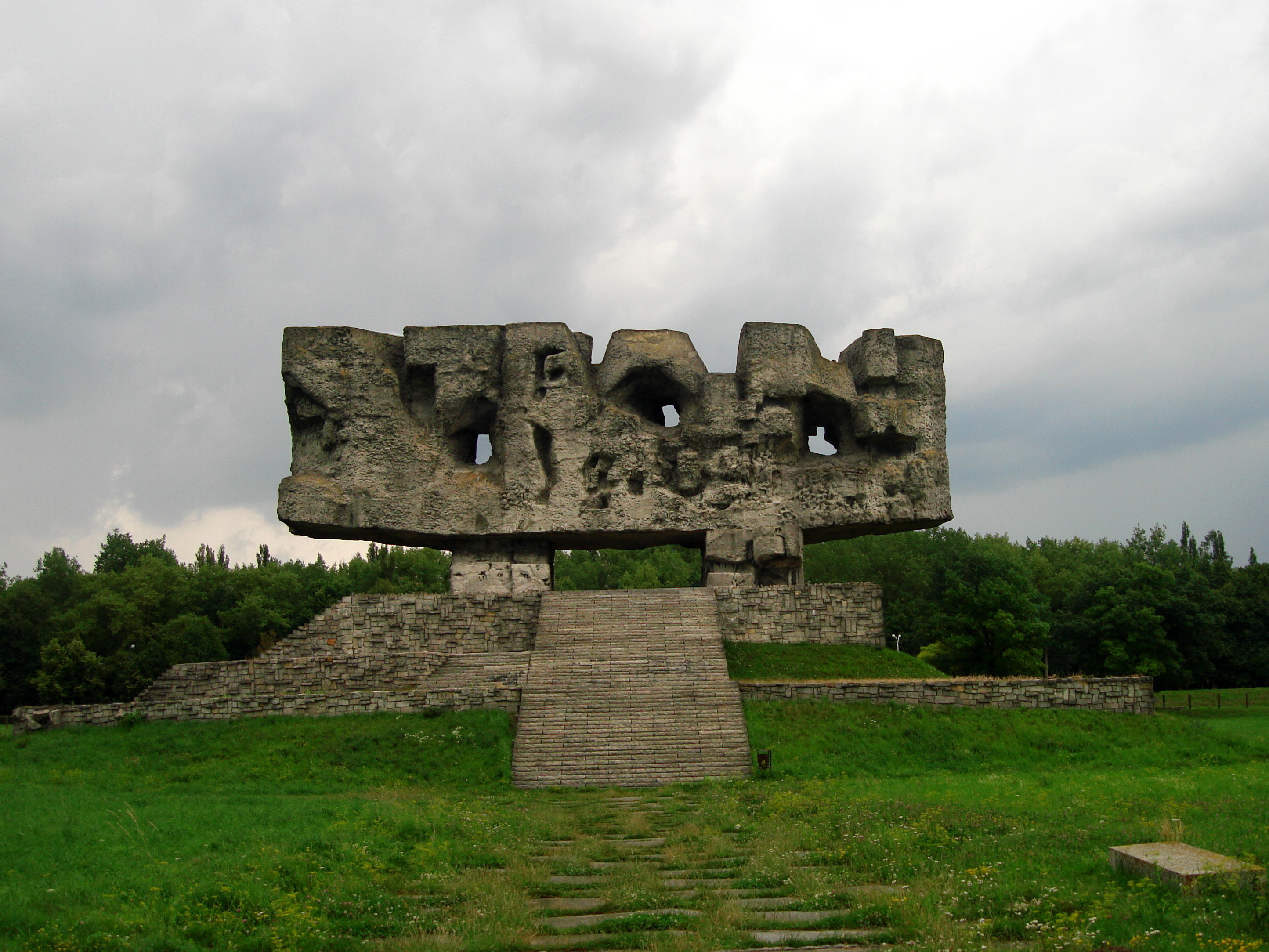
Backsight of the "Fight and Martyrdom" monument in Majdanek

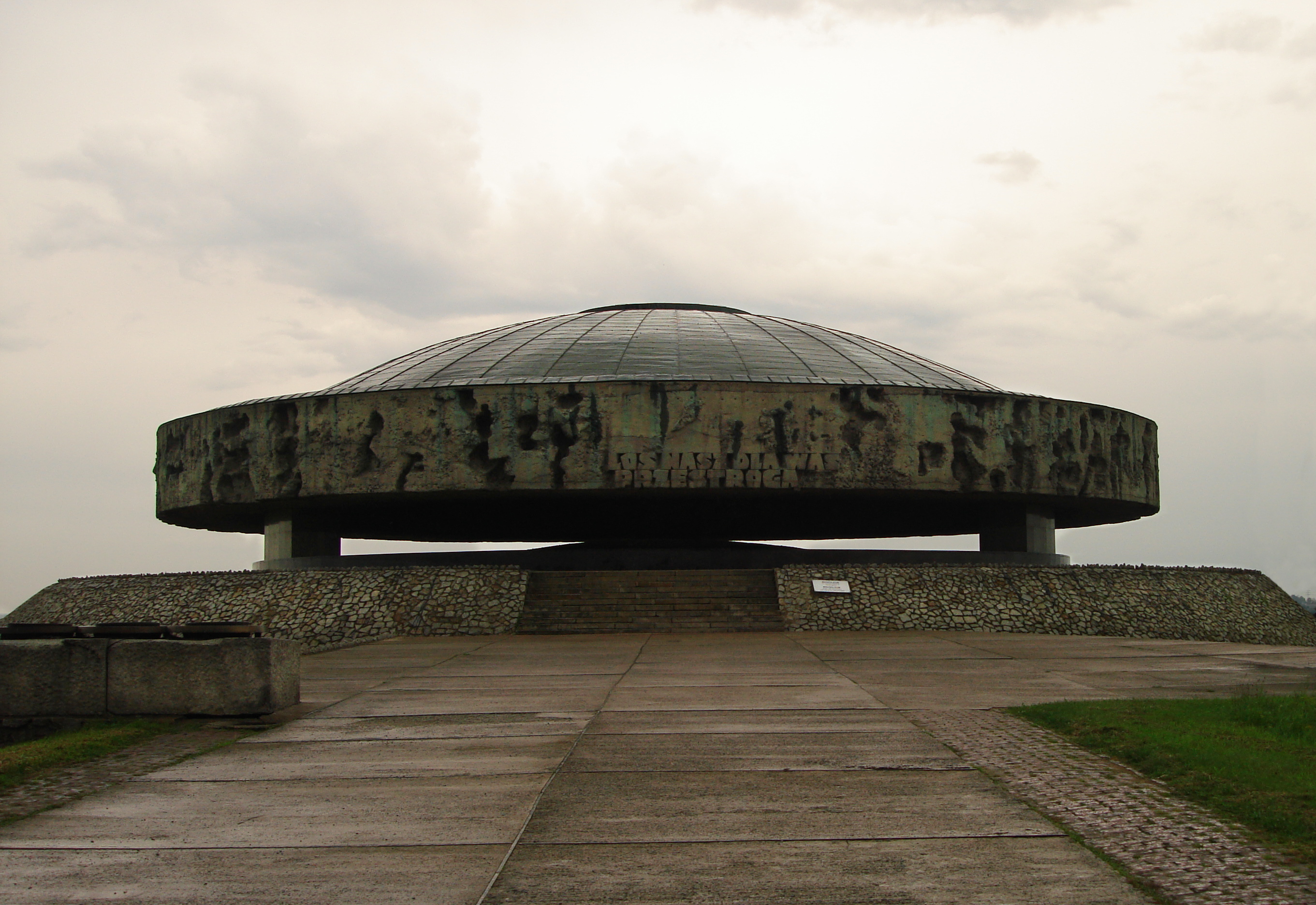
Mausoleum at Majdanek, inscription: "Let our fate be a warning to you"

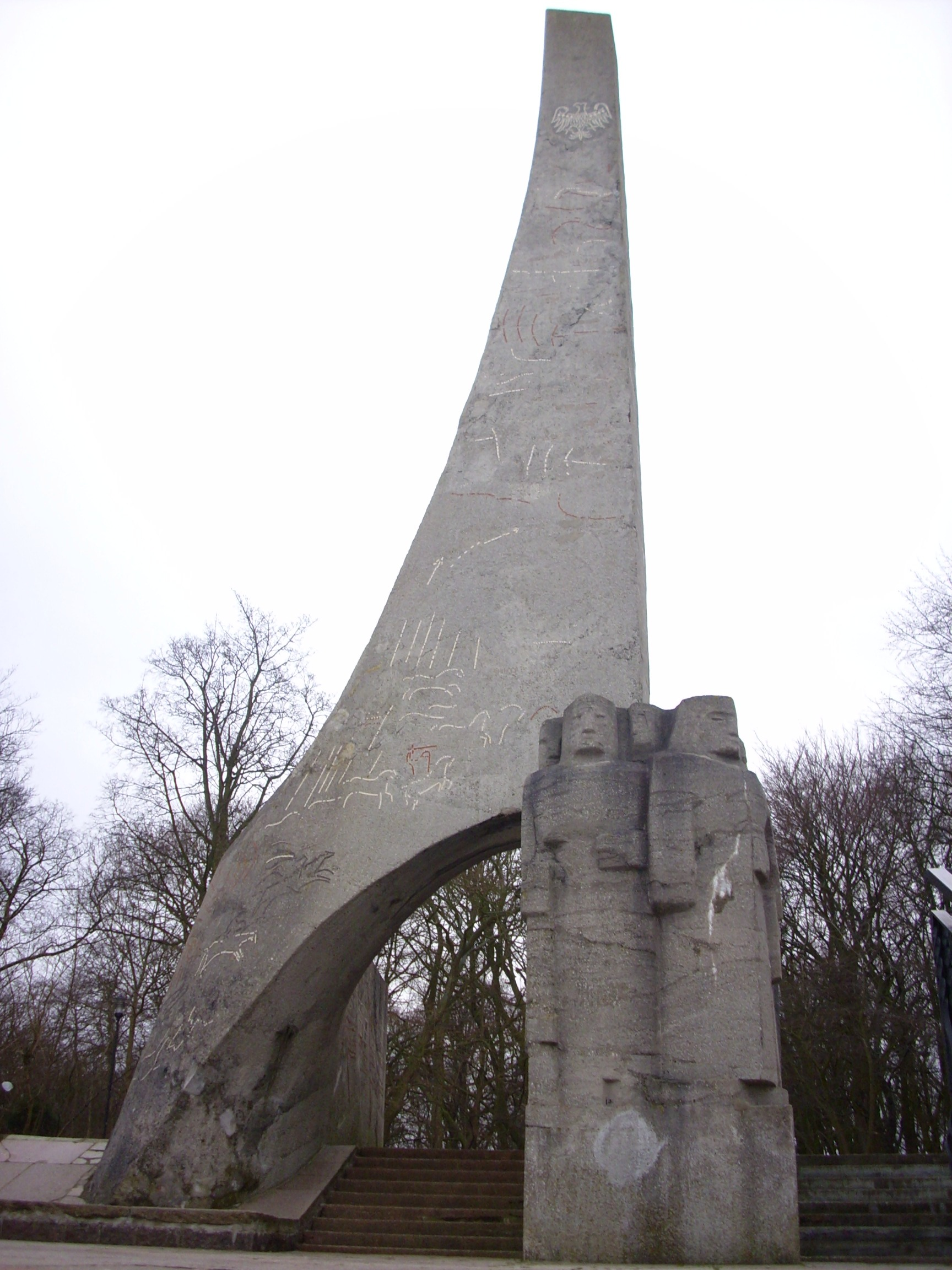
Monument to the Polish wedding at sea, Kołobrzeg

== Bibliography ==
- Pomnik Ofiar Majdanka
- Kto jest kim w Polsce, edycja IV (zespół redakcyjny Beata Cynkier i inni), Warszawa 2001, s. 970–971
