= Chmielowszczyzna =

- Village
- Location within Poland
- Coordinates: 53°21′30″N 23°39′20″E
- Country: Poland
- Voivodeship: Podlaskie
- County: Sokółka
- Gmina: Szudziałowo
- Time zone: UTC+1 (CET)
  - Summer (DST): UTC+2 (CEST)

Chmielowszczyzna [xmjɛlɔfʂˈt͡ʂɨzna] is a village in the administrative district of Gmina Szudziałowo, within Sokółka County, Podlaskie Voivodeship, in north-eastern Poland, close to the border with Belarus.

== History ==
Four Polish citizens were murdered by Nazi Germany in the village during World War II.
