= Szudziałowo =

- Village
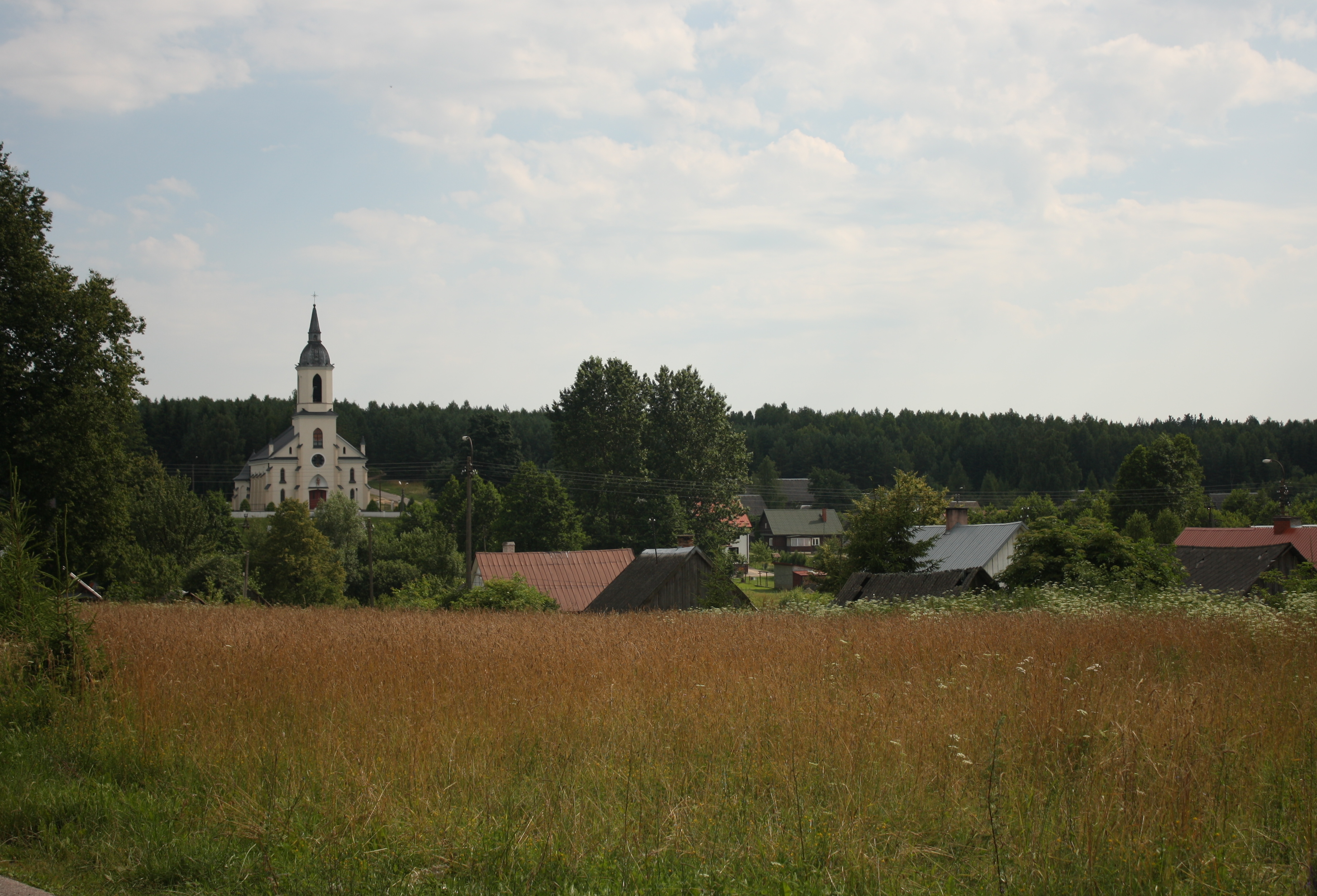
- Panorama of Szudziałowo

- Location within Poland
- Coordinates: 53°18′N 23°40′E
- Country: Poland
- Voivodeship: Podlaskie
- County: Sokółka
- Gmina: Szudziałowo
- Population: 650

Szudziałowo [ʂud͡ʑaˈwɔvɔ] is a village in Sokółka County, Podlaskie Voivodeship, in north-eastern Poland, close to the border with Belarus. It is the seat of the gmina (administrative district) called Gmina Szudziałowo.
