= Gmina Szudziałowo =

Gmina Szudziałowo Szudziałowo Commune
- Gmina
- Coat of arms

- Gmina Szudziałowo within the Sokółka County
- Coordinates (Szudziałowo): 53°18′N 23°40′E
- Country: Poland
- Voivodeship: Podlaskie
- County: Sokółka
- Seat: Szudziałowo

Area
  - Total: 301.64 km^{2} (116.46 sq mi)

Population (2006)
  - Total: 3,419
  - Density: 11.33/km^{2} (29.36/sq mi)
- Website: http://www.szudzialowo.nnt.pl/

Gmina Szudziałowo is a rural gmina (administrative district) in Sokółka County, Podlaskie Voivodeship, in north-eastern Poland, on the border with Belarus. Its seat is the village of Szudziałowo, which lies approximately 16 kilometres (10 mi) south-east of Sokółka and 40 km (25 mi) north-east of the regional capital Białystok.

The gmina covers an area of 301.64 square kilometres (116.5 sq mi), and as of 2006 its total population is 3,419.

The gmina contains part of the protected area called Knyszyń Forest Landscape Park.

== Villages ==
Gmina Szudziałowo contains the villages and settlements of Aleksandrówka, Babiki, Biały Ług, Boratyńszczyzna, Brzozowy Hrud, Chmielowszczyzna, Chmielowszczyzna-Kolonia, Dziewiczy Ług, Grodzisko, Grzybowszczyzna, Hały-Ług, Harkawicze, Horczaki, Iwniki, Jeziorek, Klin, Klin-Gajówka, Knyszewicze, Knyszewicze Małe, Kozłowy Ług, Łaźnisko, Lipowy Most, Litwinowy Ług, Markowy Wygon, Minkowce, Miszkieniki Małe, Miszkieniki Wielkie, Nowe Trzciano, Nowinka, Nowy Ostrów, Ostrów Północny, Ostrówek, Pierekał, Pierożki, Pisarzowce, Poczopek, Rowek, Samogród, Słoja, Słójka, Słójka-Borowszczyzna, Sosnowik, Stare Trzciano, Suchy Hrud, Suchynicze, Sukowicze, Szczęsnowicze, Szudziałowo, Talkowszczyzna, Tołkacze, Usnarz Górny, Wierzchlesie, Wojnowce, Zubowszczyzna, Zubrzyca Mała and Zubrzyca Wielka.

== Neighbouring gminas ==
Gmina Szudziałowo is bordered by the gminas of Gródek, Krynki, Sokółka and Supraśl. It also borders Belarus.
