= Sokółka County =

Sokółka County Powiat sokólski
- County
- Flag Coat of arms

- Location within the voivodeship
- Coordinates (Sokółka): 53°24′N 23°30′E
- Country: Poland
- Voivodeship: Podlaskie
- Seat: Sokółka
- Gminas: Total 10: Gmina Dąbrowa Białostocka; Gmina Janów; Gmina Korycin; Gmina Krynki; Gmina Kuźnica; Gmina Nowy Dwór; Gmina Sidra; Gmina Sokółka; Gmina Suchowola; Gmina Szudziałowo

Area
  - Total: 2,054.42 km^{2} (793.22 sq mi)

Population (2019)
  - Total: 67,055
  - Density: 32.639/km^{2} (84.536/sq mi)
  - Urban: 28,242
  - Rural: 38,813
- Car plates: BSK
- Website: www.sokolka-powiat.pl

Sokółka County (Polish: powiat sokólski) is a unit of territorial administration and local government (powiat) in Podlaskie Voivodeship, north-eastern Poland, on the border with Belarus. It was created on 1 January 1999 as a result of the Polish local government reforms passed in 1998. Its administrative seat and largest town is Sokółka, which lies 39 kilometres (24 mi) north-east of the regional capital Białystok. The county also contains the towns of Dąbrowa Białostocka, lying 30 km (19 mi) north of Sokółka, Krynki, lying 24 km (15 mi) south-east of Sokółka, and Suchowola, 33 km (21 mi) north-west of Sokółka.

The county covers an area of 2,054.42 square kilometres (793.2 sq mi). As of 2019 its total population is 67,055, out of which the population of Sokółka is 18,134, that of Dąbrowa Białostocka is 5,520, that of Krynki is 2,405, that of Suchowola is 2,183, and the rural population is 38,813.

== Neighbouring counties ==
Sokółka County is bordered by Białystok County to the south-west, Mońki County to the west and Augustów County to the north-west. It also borders Belarus to the east.

== Administrative divisions ==
The county is subdivided into 10 gminas (four urban-rural and six rural). These are listed in the following table, in descending order of population.

Gmina	Type	Area (km^{2})	Population (2019)	Seat
Gmina Sokółka	urban-rural	313.6	25,438	Sokółka
Gmina Dąbrowa Białostocka	urban-rural	264.0	11,402	Dąbrowa Białostocka
Gmina Suchowola	urban-rural	255.9	6,900	Suchowola
Gmina Janów	rural	207.8	4,109	Janów
Gmina Kuźnica	rural	133.4	3,967	Kuźnica
Gmina Sidra	rural	174.0	3,417	Sidra
Gmina Korycin	rural	117.3	3,237	Korycin
Gmina Krynki	urban-rural	165.9	3,079	Krynki
Gmina Szudziałowo	rural	301.6	2,880	Szudziałowo
Gmina Nowy Dwór	rural	120.9	2,626	Nowy Dwór

== Notable residents ==
Jazep Varonka (1891, Kuźnica village – 1952), Belarusian politician, first Chairman of the Belarusian Democratic Republic
