= Wierszalin =

Abandoned village in north-eastern Poland

- Abandoned village
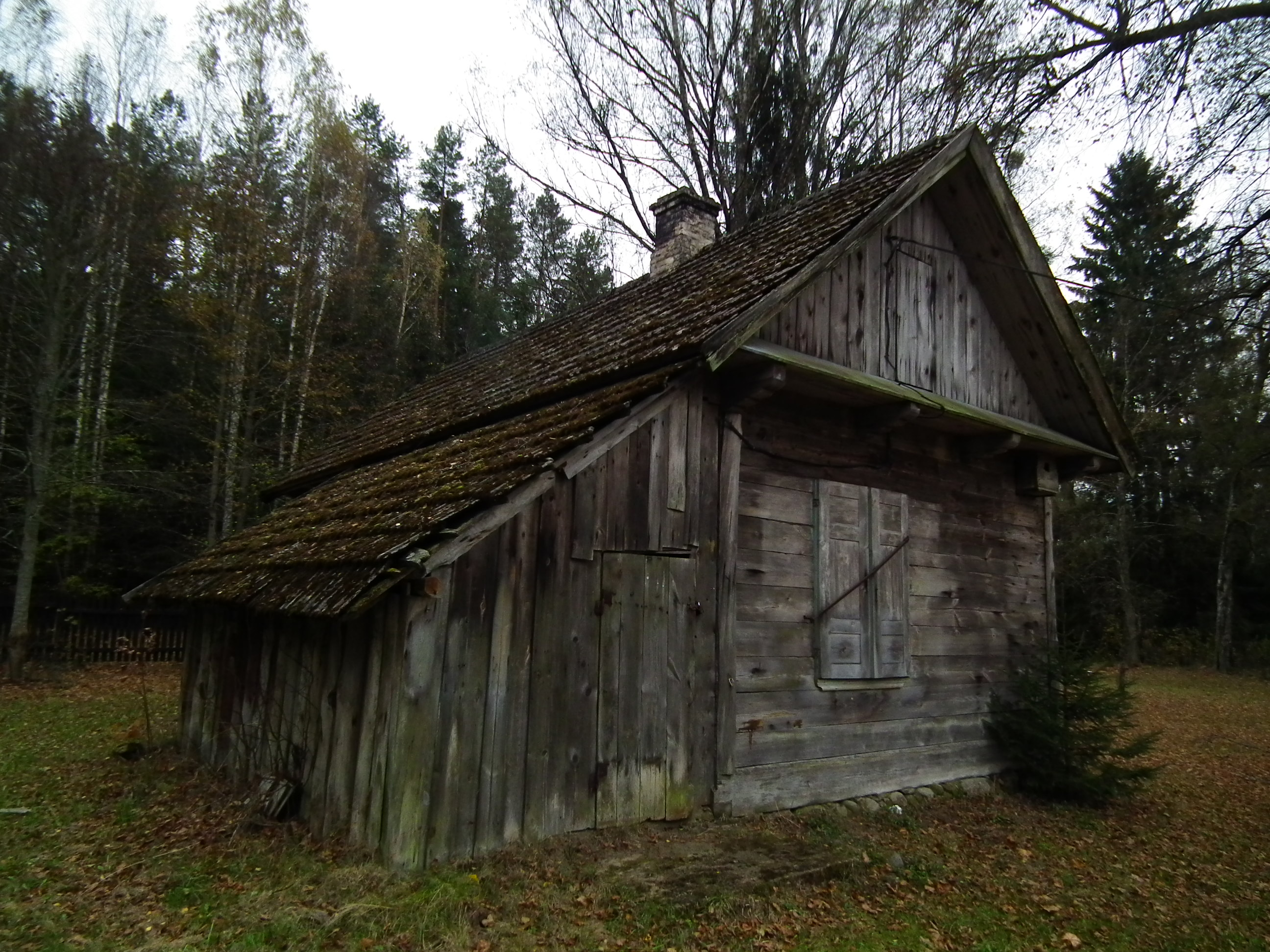
- House in Wierszalin

- Location within Poland
- Coordinates: 53°11′47″N 23°42′16″E
- Country: Poland
- Voivodeship: Podlaskie
- County: Sokółka
- Gmina: Krynki
- Population: 0

Wierszalin is an abandoned village in the administrative district of Gmina Krynki, within Sokółka County, Podlaskie Voivodeship, in north-eastern Poland, close to the border with Belarus.

== History ==
The village (also called a hamlet, a colony, or a town) was founded in a forest near Stara Grzybowszczyzna by Eliasz Klimowicz, a Polish-Belarusian Orthodox cult leader. He wanted Wierszalin to be the "New Jerusalem" and a capital of the whole world. The village's name, Wierszalin, originated from the Slavonic word sovershilos ("it is accomplished").

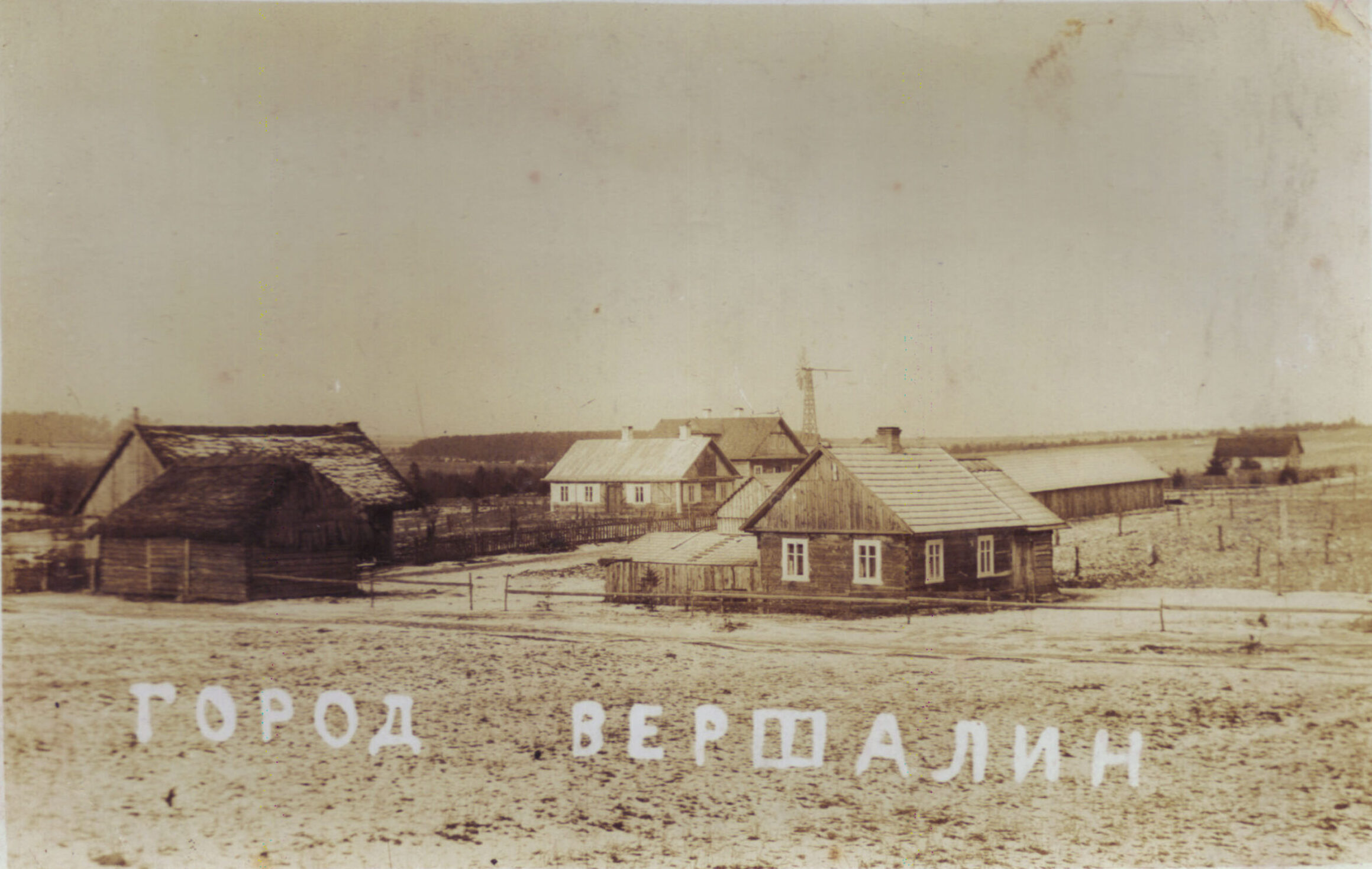
Wierszalin in 1939

Klimowicz's followers: Ilja Iwaniuk, Józef Miron and Michał Miniuk, started raising wooden houses and a shed for pilgrims. By the mid-1930s, tens of people decided to settle in Wierszalin. Eventually, the village's population would reach a number of a couple hundred.

Paweł Wołoszyn attempted to construct a wind farm that would supply the village with electricity. His plans failed due to a lack of wind near Wierszalin. An attempt to produce hydroelectricity also failed. Klimowicz planned to build a church, a hospital, a flower shop, a school, and monasteries at every edge of Wierszalin. The Polish government did not allow the construction of a church.

People started leaving Wierszalin after Klimowicz was arrested by the Soviets in October 1939. During the Second World War, the Germans demolished two houses in Wierszalin and rebuilt them in Ostrów Południowy and Leszczany.

Up to the 1960s, at the crossroads near Wierszalin stood a cross with a Cyrillic transcription. The last person living in the village was Borys Wołoszyn, a son of Paweł. Reportedly, he was also Klimowicz's last believer. A few buildings remain in Wierszalin. People interested in Klimowicz pay visits to the village. Its territory belongs to the Krynki Forest District. A historical theme park was created there. Memorabilia from Wierszalin are stored in the Museum of Icons in Supraśl.
