= Eliasz Klimowicz =

Polish-Belarusian cult leader

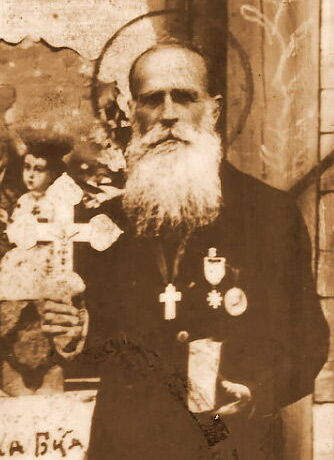
- Eliasz Klimowicz

Personal life
- Born: 2 August 1864 Grzybowszczyzna, Russian Empire (now Poland)
- Died: 1940 or later
- Spouse: Jewdokija (m. 1890; died 1901) Zofia Prokopczyk (m. 1901–1919)
- Children: Włodzimierz; Wiera; Wincenty
- Parents: Wawrzyniec (father); Józefina (mother)
- Region: Podlachia (Stara Grzybowszczyzna, Wierszalin)
- Known for: Leader of the "Grzybowszczyzna sect"
- Other names: Ilja the Prophet, Ilja Grzybowski
- Occupation: Peasant

Religious life
- Religion: Eastern Orthodoxy

Eliasz Klimowicz (2 August 1864 – 1940 or later), also referred to as Prorok Ilja ("Ilja the Prophet") and Ilja Grzybowski ("Ilja of Grzybowszczyzna"), was a Polish-Belarusian peasant and a dissident Eastern Orthodox religious leader, active in the Podlachia region.

== Early life ==
Klimowicz was born in the village of Grzybowszczyzna, in Grodno Governorate of the Russian Empire (now in Podlaskie Voivodeship, Poland). He came from a religiously mixed family of Orthodox and Catholic Christians. His father, Wawrzyniec, was a veteran of the January Uprising and an Orthodox. His mother, Józefina, was Catholic. He was named after the biblical prophet Elijah and baptised in the Orthodox church in Ostrów Północny. He had two brothers.

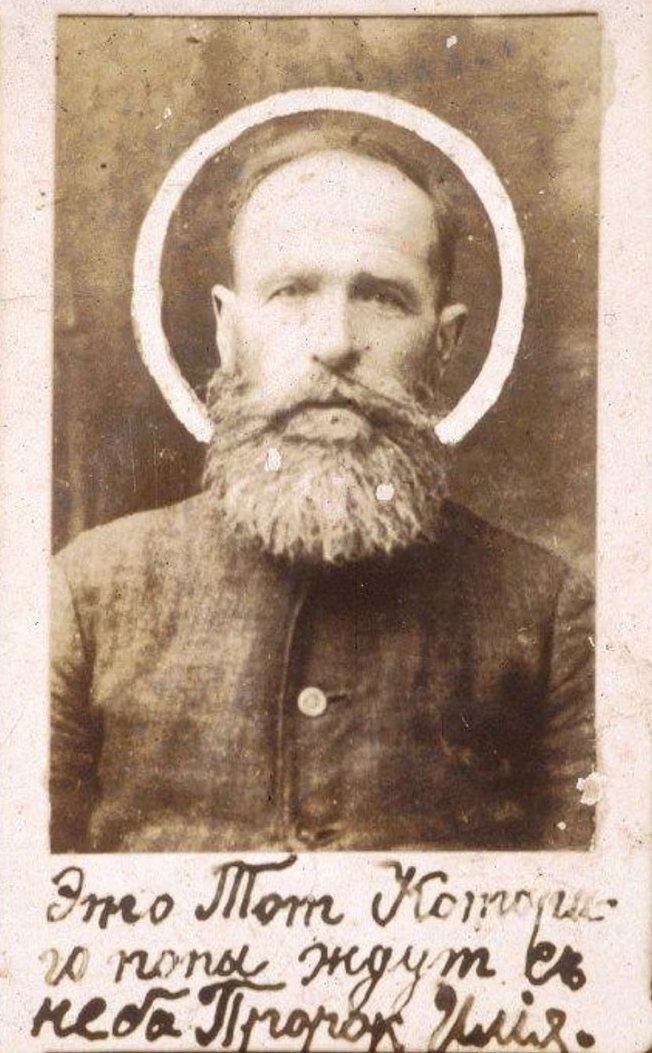
Young Klimowicz

Klimowicz did not attend any school and was illiterate. After serving in the military, in early 1890s he married a woman named Jewdokija, with whom he had a son, Włodzimierz (died in 1900 at the age of seven), and a daughter, Wiera. Jewdokija died on 14 March 1901, at the age of 34. Two months later, on 21 May 1901, Klimowicz married Zofia Prokopczyk from Leszczany. It is not known which woman was the mother of his second son, Wincenty.

Klimowicz worked on a farm that he inherited from his father. He lived in a khutor (a hamlet), about 1 kilometre (0.62 mi) away from Stara Grzybowszczyzna. He started "experiencing visions" after he received a copy of the Black Madonna of Częstochowa. In a "mysterious dream" that he experienced at the start of the 20th century an old man allegedly told Klimowicz to "start building a church right here". In search for an explanation of the dream in 1906 he traveled to Kronstadt to seek Father John's counseling. John told Klimowicz that the dream was a message from God, who wanted him to build a church in his village. To help him raise funds for the temple, Father John wrote a testimonial certifying Klimowicz's conversation with God as a fact. Klimowicz also received a document which authorized fundraising for the construction of the church across the Russian Empire.

== Funding a church ==
Klimowicz received five thousand rubles after his older brother was killed in Grodno. He also sold most of the land that he inherited from his father. After two years of fundraising, he started building the church in Stara Grzybowszczyzna in 1904. In 1906, around the same time as Klimowicz's pilgrimage to John of Kronstad, a local bandit named "Półtorak", who had terrorised the villages of Grzybowszczyzna was killed during an attempted robbery. The local population connected this sudden relief with Klimowicz's pilgrimage and declared it miracle.

Klimowicz returned from his travels with a significant amount of money and continued construction of the church. The source of the money was unknown, but many locals believed it came from Father John. Klimowicz also continued to fundraise. The building however was unfinished due to the start of the First World War. Klimowicz took part in the Bieżeństwo, a mass evacuation of the Orthodox population into the depths of Russia in 1915. Instead of Tsarist Russia he admired from his travels he witness the ongoing Russian Revolution and various tragedies, including cases of cannibalism and mass murder. Klimowicz started to believe that "the end of the world" is coming.

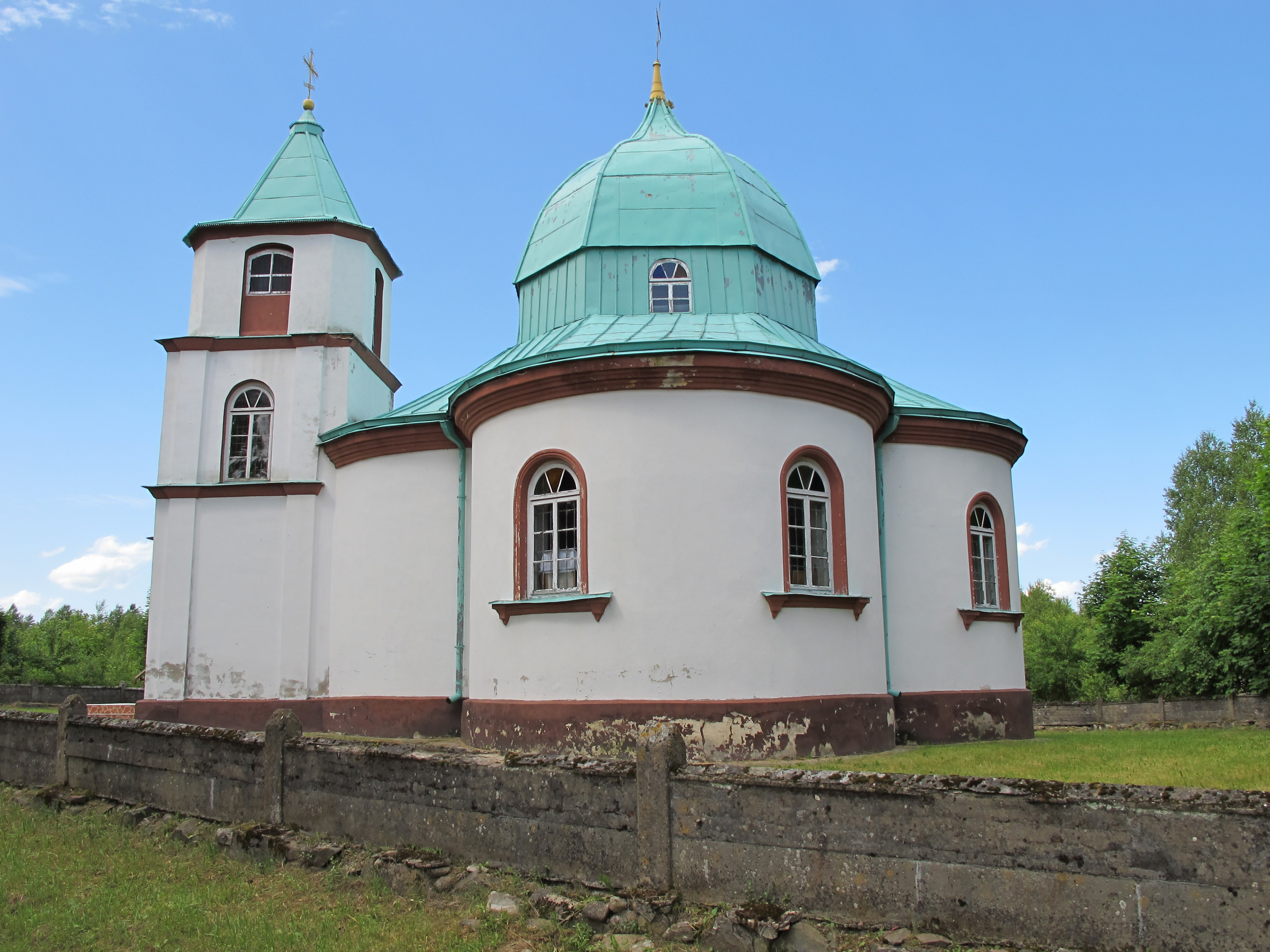
The church in Stara Grzybowszczyzna, founded by Klimowicz

Around 1919, Klimowicz returned to his home village, now in independent Poland. Shortly after, his wife and daughter left him, allegedly due to financial struggles after he sold his farm to fund the church. In 1926, the Polish government allowed him to finish building the church. The construction was finished in 1929. Soon, stories of Klimowicz's "healings and prophecies" started circulating, spread and promoted by women who collected funds for the church's construction. It was said that Klimowicz's church "emerged from the earth on its own". In the years that followed, thousands of pilgrims from the regions of Podlachia, Vilnius, Grodno, Polesia and Volhynia visited Klimowicz in Stara Grzybowszczyzna. He was nicknamed Prorok Ilja ("Ilja the Prophet") by his followers, who saw him as a reincarnation of the biblical prophet Elijah.

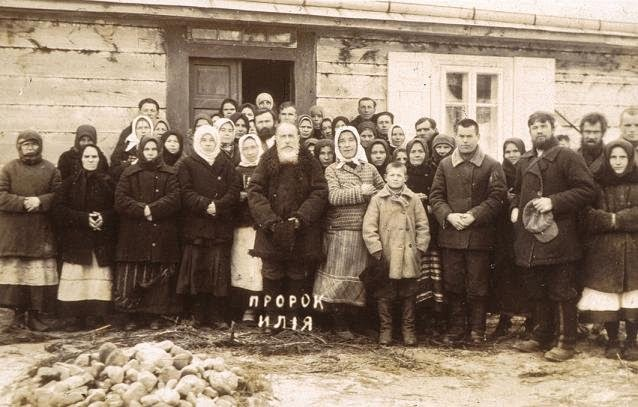
Klimowicz surrounded by pilgrims

Klimowicz received many donations from his followers, but he did not care about the money, nor did he know how to count it. He gave the money away to the people of Sokółka and Krynki, and also donated it to orphanages and hospitals. For his charity work, he was awarded a medal by Józef Piłsudski. He had good relations with Polish administration and Catholic clergy. He was also rewarded the Honorary Badge of the Airborne and Antigas Defence League.

== Conflict with Orthodox clergy ==
Due to Klimowicz's rising fame, the Orthodox clergy decided to grant him holy orders. Klimowicz agreed to receive them under a condition that the church will remain under his ownership. However, a day after his holy orders, the church was taken over by the clergy, and a different priest was designated to it. This started a conflict between Klimowicz and the clergy.

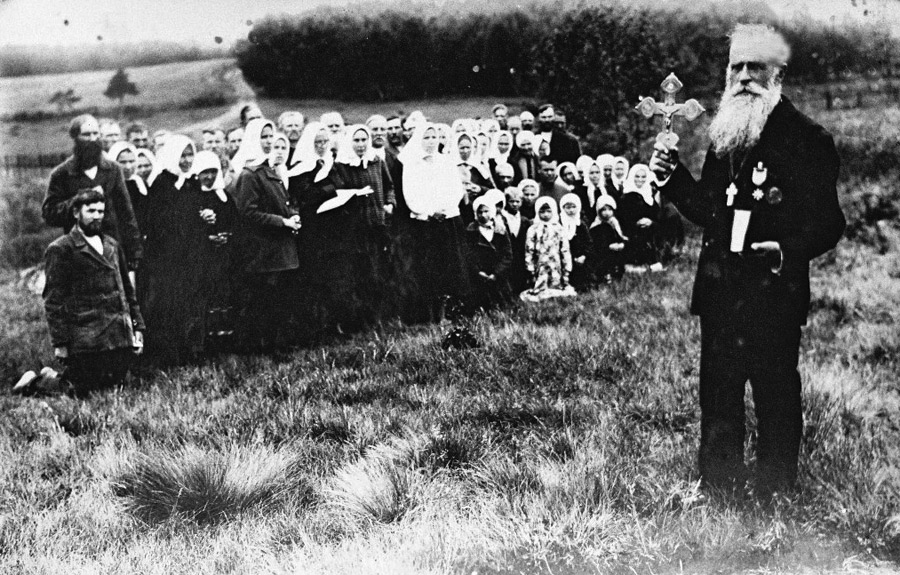
Klimowicz with his followers

The Orthodox clergymen started repressing Klimowicz and his followers. They called him a heretic and a blasphemer, and criticised him for falsely interpreting the Bible. The police investigated him for "inciting unrest among people" and for an alleged murder. Rumors about Klimowicz's "sexual excesses" with his female followers started circulating. He lived together with a group of so-called "holy women" (święte baby).

Klimowicz's followers began to take action on their own, proclaiming revelations in nearby villages such as Puchły and Ciełuszki. They claimed that he had the ability to cure multiple illnesses, including blindness, amnesia, infertility, as well as to predict and control the weather. In 1931, Joan Bogosłow organised multiple pilgrimages to Vilnius and Poczajów, during which he promoted Klimowicz's image as a prophet, gaining him a stronger audience from Volhynia. There were conflicts with local clergy and taking over temples for worship.

Over the years, Klimowicz began to distance himself from Orthodoxy while simultaneously embracing aspects of Catholicism, as he believed that "The Catholic Church currently brings people closer to God and educates them for the benefit of the Most Serene Republic of Poland."

== Inner struggles within the cult ==
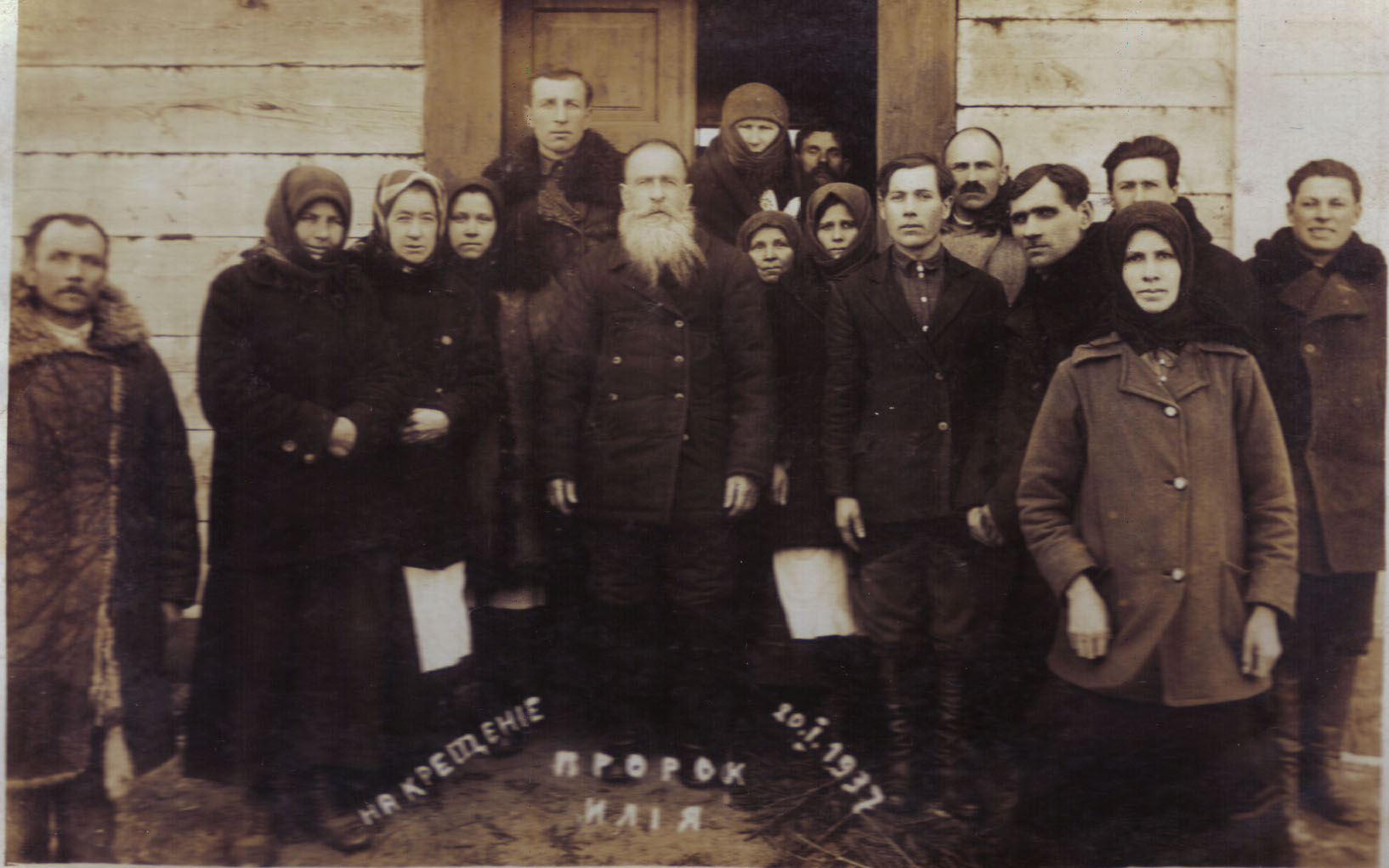
Klimowicz and his followers in Stara Grzybowszczyzna, January 1937

The followers began to ascribe biblical connotations to themselves, calling themselves archangels, apostles and mothers of God. The cult had its own song book, containing songs written by Paweł Bielski in praise of Klimowicz. In a 1937 report for the local government, the actions of Klimowicz's followers were described as a "religious psychosis".

In one incident, a woman who was a follower of Klimowicz broke 22 windows in a school building in Ciełuszki, uprooted five fruit trees and knocked down two Orthodox crosses. She also broke windows in her house and in the houses of other cult members, all while naked and singing religious songs. Her fellow cult members chained her to a wall and held her there for over a year, feeding her only thrice a month and occasionally singing psalms to her. Another cult member attacked his wife with a spinning wheel because he wanted to "kill a devil which he saw on her". A different follower of Klimowicz, believing he was an angel, decided to jump into the freezing Narew river during winter.

Two sects broke out of Klimowicz's cult. The first one, nicknamed nikołajowcy, was led by Józef Bachliński, a man who arrived in Puchły in 1931 and joined Klimowicz's cult. Bachliński managed to fool his followers into believing that he is Tsar Nicholas II, and that he will grant them "high positions in the government" and more land once he regains power in Russia. Followers of the second sect, led by Klimowicz's psalm-writer and a self-described apostle Paweł Bielski, believed that Jesus Christ's Second Coming has already happened. They declared Thursday a day of worship and rest. In one book written by Bielski, he retold several stories from the Bible, placing them in 1930 in the area of Bielsk Podlaski, and identifying Jesus as Klimowicz.

== Building the New Jerusalem ==
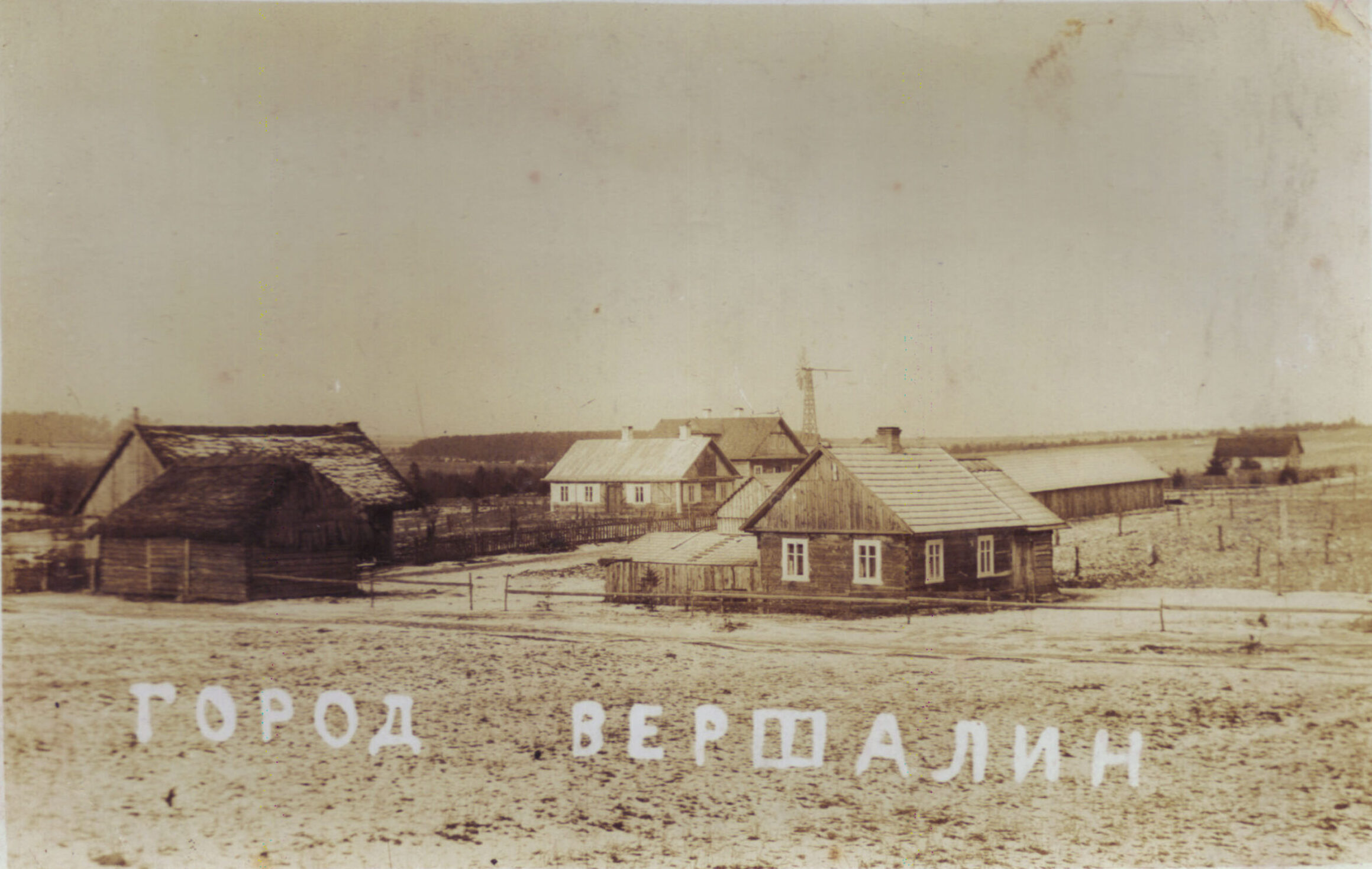
Wierszalin in 1939

Klimowicz founded a village for himself and his followers. The village, which he named Wierszalin, was located in a forest near Stara Grzybowszczyzna, and was meant to be the "New Jerusalem" and a capital of the whole world. Satan was supposed to be unable to enter Wierszalin. By the mid-1930s, tens of people decided to settle in Wierszalin.

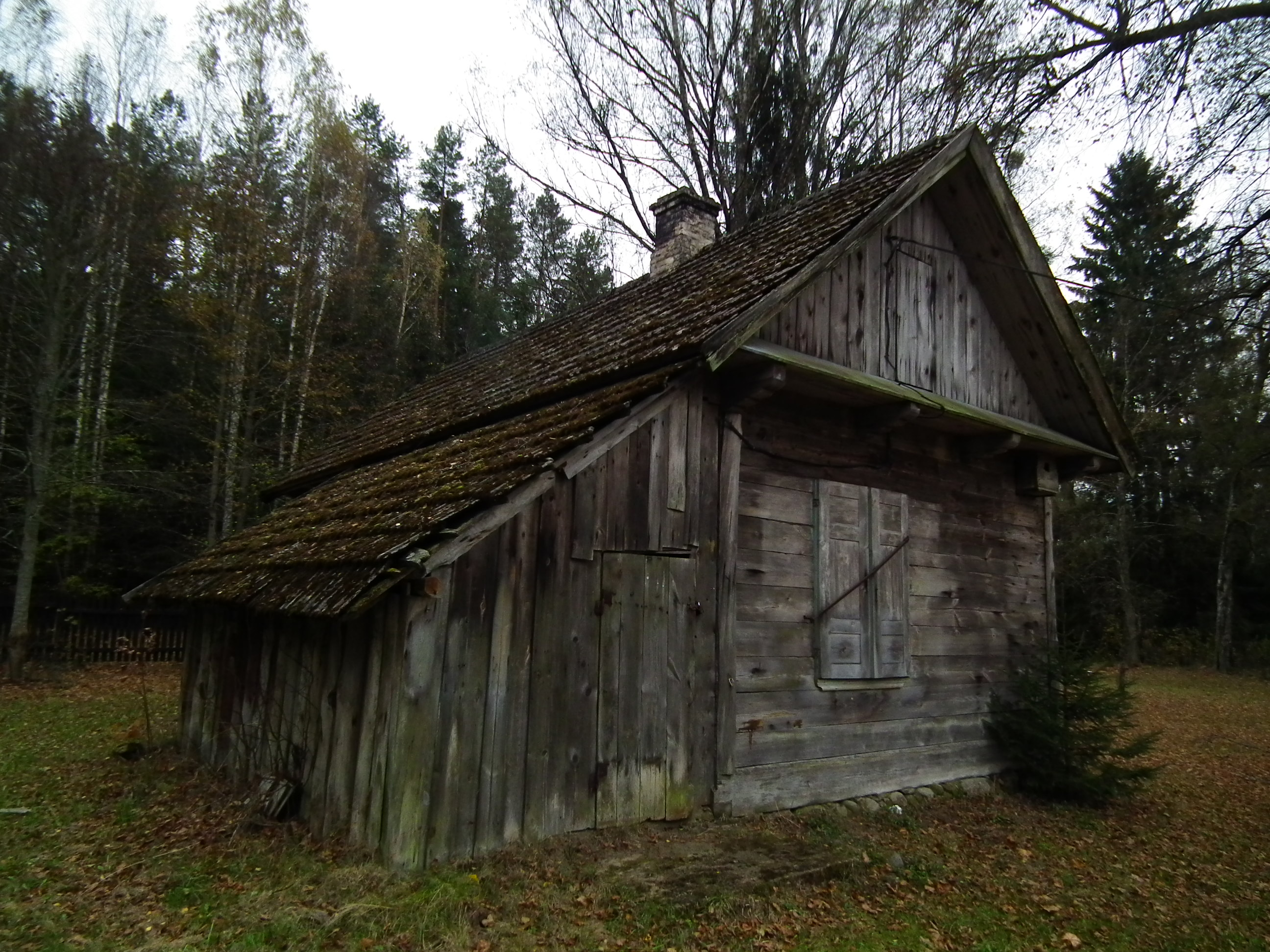
A house in Wierszalin, 2016

Klimowicz's reputation suffered after he refused to be crucified by his followers, who began to see him as a reincarnation of Jesus Christ, and because "the end of the world" prophesied by him did not take place. Despite this, pilgrims from all of Poland were still attracted to him, and he was still surrounded by a notable group of believers and had his missionaries.

In 1938, Klimowicz won a court case against the Orthodox clergy and took back his church in Stara Grzybowszczyzna. However, he decided to sell it to Maria Soroczyńska, a Catholic from Sokółka, who then passed it over to the Curia of Vilnius. Klimowicz wanted to build a second, bigger church in Wierszalin, but the Polish government did not allow the construction. This failure lead to more followers abandoning Klimowicz.

== Disappearance ==
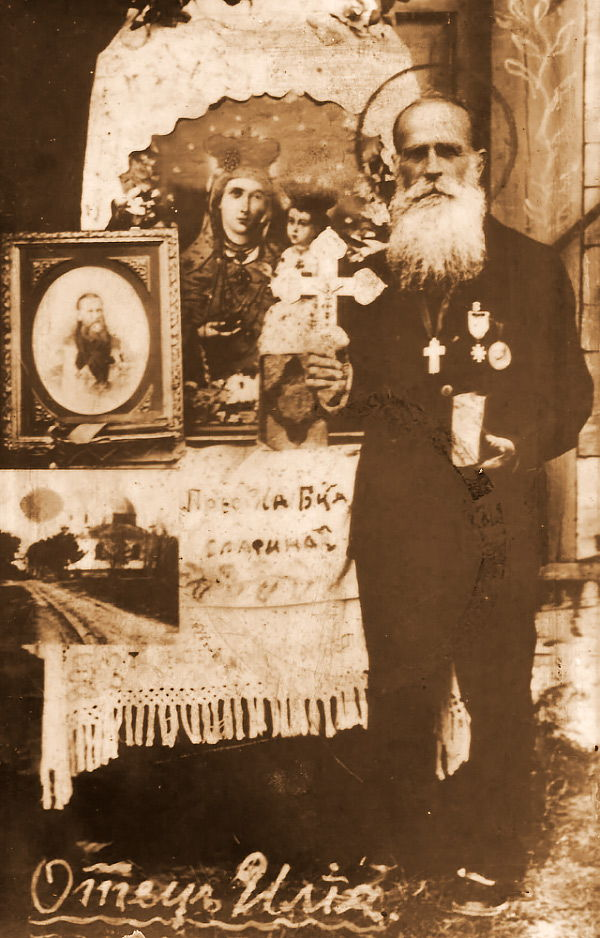
Klimowicz next to an icon of Madonna and Child

Klimowicz disappeared at the start of the Second World War, shortly after the Soviet invasion of Poland in September 1939. It was not known what happened to him. There arose several theories regarding his later life and death.

According to one story, he was killed by the Soviets or local communists. Some of his followers believed he moved deep into the Soviet Union, as he was allegedly sighted in Mariinsk. Another theory says that he was arrested by the Soviets while attending the Elections to the People's Assemblies of Western Ukraine and Western Belorussia in October 1939, imprisoned in Białystok, then sent to Siberia, and died in a retirement home in Krasnoyarsk.

The last theory found a partial confirmation in documents published by the Memorial organisation, which studies crimes against humanity committed in the Soviet Union. According to them, Klimowicz was arrested by the NKVD on 28 October 1939 in Pawły. He was accused of "anti-Soviet agitation", and on 4 September 1940 he was sentenced to five years in a Gulag labor camp.

== Legacy ==
Klimowicz's cult did not cease activities after his disappearance in 1939. His female followers, known as "holy women", kept the cult alive. Church services for the cult were conducted first by Paweł Wołoszyn, next by Nadia Antoniuk, and finally by Tatiana Kowalczuk. Over the next decades, groups of Klimowicz's cult members were active in Ciełuszki, Trześcianka, Pawły, Michałowo, Pieńki, and Kamień. Members of the Ciełuszki group started building a church for themselves in 1943, but the construction was halted when they were arrested by German Nazis.

In the book Wierszalin. Reportaż o końcu świata, Włodzimierz Pawluczuk described his encounters with several people who still believed in Klimowicz's alleged supernatural abilities during his visits to Stara Grzybowszczyzna and nearby villages in the 1970s. Some of Klimowicz's followers were still performing church services in Wierszalin. Pawluczuk also described people who believed Klimowicz was still alive and would fulfill his prophecy by either returning to Wierszalin or by directly influencing Soviet leaders in Moscow. Klimowicz's followers buried their close ones at a cemetery by the church in Stara Grzybowszczyzna. Some of them had to be buried "under cover of the night", as the local clergymen did not allow their burials. Two of Klimowicz's "holy women" were also buried there.

Klimowicz's last "holy woman" died in the early 1990s. In the 2000s, two people were reported to be some of Klimowicz's last believers: Borys Wołoszyn (the last resident of Wierszalin) and a woman living in Stara Grzybowszczyzna. According to National Geographic's 2019 article, images, paintings, and various memorabilia of Klimowicz could still be found in local people's houses.

Radosław Brożyna, a man from Mazovia, decided to settle in Stara Grzybowszczyzna in order to study and popularize the story of Klimowicz and his cult. In an article for Onet.pl in 2025, Diana Wawrzusiszyn revealed that there still were people who consider themselves followers of Klimowicz. Some of them continued to attend services in the Stara Grzybowszczyzna church on 2 August, when prophet Elijah is commemorated. Wawrzusiszyn reported that the last living follower who personally met Klimowicz was an over 90-year-old woman named Maria from Puchły.

The village of Wierszalin remains abandoned since the death of Borys Wołoszyn. Administration of the local forest district created a historical theme park there. Foundations of Klimowicz's unfinished church in Wierszalin were cleaned up, and round stones with symbols of several monotheistic religions were embedded into them, creating a "Monotheistic Temple of the World" (Monoteistyczna Świątynia Świata). This adaptation of the ruins in Wierszalin was met with critique from the local population and media.

== In popular culture ==
Polish anthropologist and religious scholar Włodzimierz Pawluczuk researched the cult in 1967. Pawluczuk initially published his findings in scholarly publications and newspapers and later in 1974 compiled his findings into a journalistic book titled "Wierszalin: Reportaż o końcu świata". In 2004, Pawluczuk also published a fictional work, Judasz, which centers its plot on the events surrounding Klimowicz and Wierszalin.

The Teatr Wierszalin theater named itself after Klimowicz and his village. One of its plays directed by Piotr Tomaszuk and titled "Wierszalin:Reportaż o końcu świata" adopts portions of Pawluczuk's book into a drama.

Eliasz Klimowicz is a protagonist of Tadeusz Słobodzianek's play, titled Prorok Ilja.

Belarusian writer Aliaksei Karpiuk wrote a novel about Klimowicz and his cult, titled Veršalinski raj ("Wierszalin Paradise") and published in 1974.

Historia o proroku Eliaszu z Wierszalina, a film about Klimowicz, directed by Krzysztof Wojciechowski, was released in 1997. In the movie, Klimowicz was portrayed by Henryk Talar. Several documentary films were made about Klimowicz, including a German one: Das Paradies auf Erden by Hans Madej.

In 2025, Polish black metal band Patriarkh released a concept album titled Пророк Илия ("Prorok Ilja"), which details the story of Klimowicz.

== Bibliography ==
- Pawluczuk, Włodzimierz (1974). Wierszalin. Reportaż o końcu świata. Wydawnictwo Literackie.
- Załęski, Wojciech (2015). Eliasz. Fenomen pogranicza świadomości. Białystok-Supraśl: Collegium Suprasliense. ISBN 978-83-63470-37-1.
