= Sanniki =

Sanniki may refer to the following places:

- Sanniki, Masovian Voivodeship (central Poland)
- Sanniki, Białystok County in Podlaskie Voivodeship (north-east Poland)
- Sanniki, Sokółka County in Podlaskie Voivodeship (north-east Poland)
- Sanniki, Greater Poland Voivodeship (west-central Poland)
