= Żylicze =

- Village
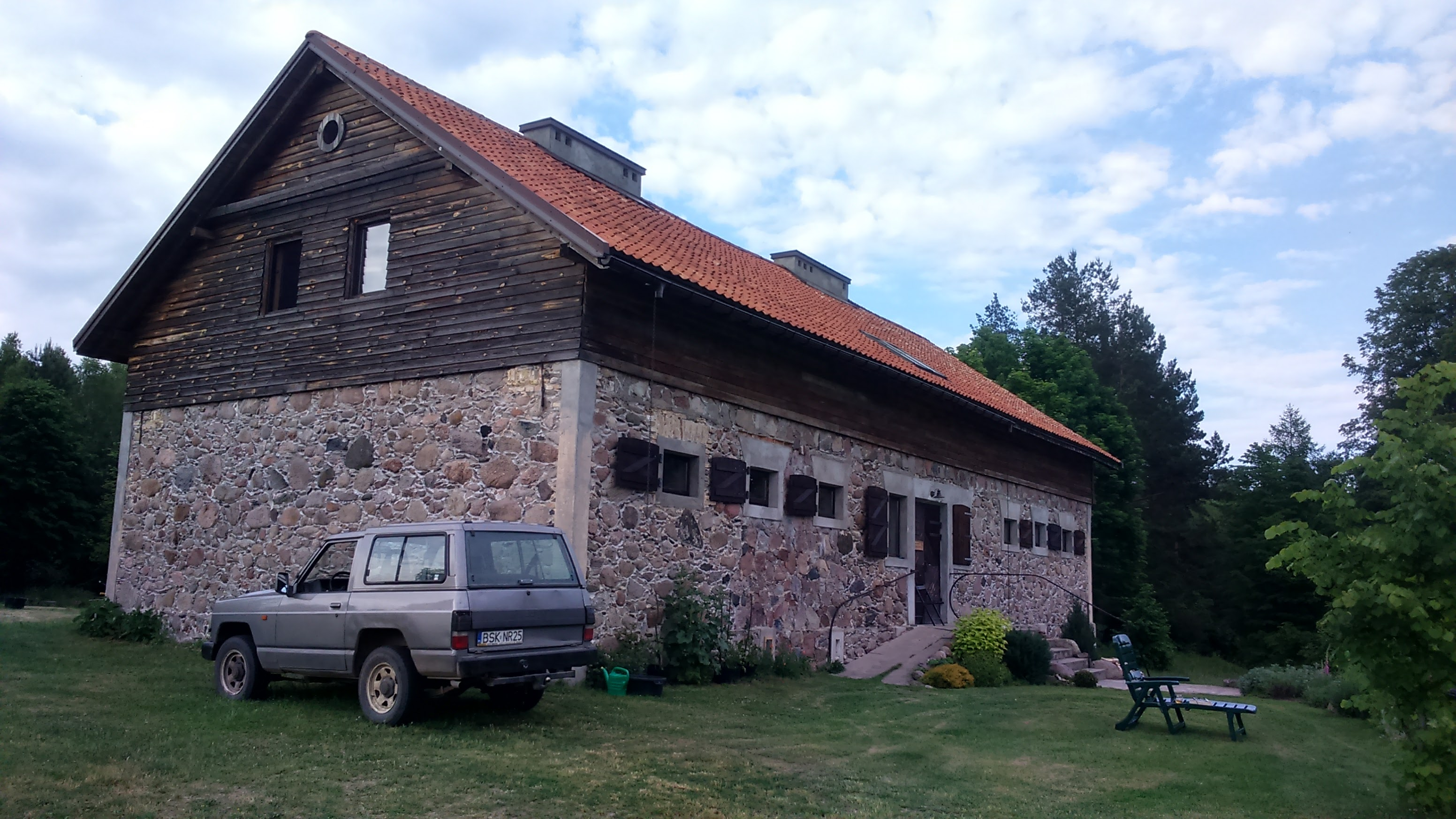

- Location within Poland
- Coordinates: 53°11′13″N 23°45′41″E
- Country: Poland
- Voivodeship: Podlaskie
- County: Sokółka
- Gmina: Krynki

Żylicze [ʐɨˈlit͡ʂɛ] is a village in the administrative district of Gmina Krynki, within Sokółka County, Podlaskie Voivodeship, in north-eastern Poland, close to the border with Belarus.
