= Nietupa =

- Village
- Location within Poland
- Coordinates: 53°14′01″N 23°49′01″E
- Country: Poland
- Voivodeship: Podlaskie
- County: Sokółka
- Gmina: Krynki
- Population: 40

Nietupa [ɲɛˈtupa] is a village in the administrative district of Gmina Krynki, within Sokółka County, Podlaskie Voivodeship, in north-eastern Poland, close to the border with Belarus.
