= Podszaciły =

Settlement in Gmina Krynki, Poland

- Settlement
- Location within Poland
- Coordinates: 53°13′02″N 23°38′52″E
- Country: Poland
- Voivodeship: Podlaskie
- County: Sokółka
- Gmina: Krynki

Podszaciły [pɔtʂaˈt͡ɕiwɨ] is a settlement in the administrative district of Gmina Krynki, within Sokółka County, Podlaskie Voivodeship, in north-eastern Poland, close to the border with Belarus.
