= Borsukowizna, Sokółka County =

Borsukowizna
- Village
- Location within Poland
- Coordinates: 53°13′7″N 23°38′57″E
- Country: Poland
- Voivodeship: Podlaskie
- County: Sokółka
- Gmina: Krynki

Borsukowizna [bɔrsukɔˈvʲizna] is a village in the administrative district of Gmina Krynki, within Sokółka County, Podlaskie Voivodeship, in north-eastern Poland, close to the border with Belarus.
