= Jamasze =

- Settlement
- Location within Poland
- Coordinates: 53°13′08″N 23°38′58″E
- Country: Poland
- Voivodeship: Podlaskie
- County: Sokółka
- Gmina: Krynki

Jamasze [jaˈmaʂɛ] is a settlement in the administrative district of Gmina Krynki, within Sokółka County, Podlaskie Voivodeship, in north-eastern Poland, close to the border with Belarus.

== History ==
The village was established more than 500 years ago. According to the 1921 Polish census, 34 people lived in the village. Twenty men and fourteen women. During World War II, the village witnessed atrocities committed by the Germans, who severely beat one inhabitant and set dogs on him for fishing. When the Soviet entered the area, they took all relatively young men with them. The last inhabitant left in 1979. When he returned, it turned out that everything had already been stolen. Today in the village's location there is a cross and a plaque commemorating the existence of the village.
