= Chłodne Włóki =

Village in Gmina Krynki, Poland

- Village
- Location within Poland
- Coordinates: 53°13′11″N 23°44′04″E
- Country: Poland
- Voivodeship: Podlaskie
- County: Sokółka
- Gmina: Krynki

Chłodne Włóki [ˈxwɔdnɛ ˈvwuki] is a village in the administrative district of Gmina Krynki, within Sokółka County, Podlaskie Voivodeship, in north-eastern Poland, close to the border with Belarus.
