= Nowa Świdziałówka =

- Village
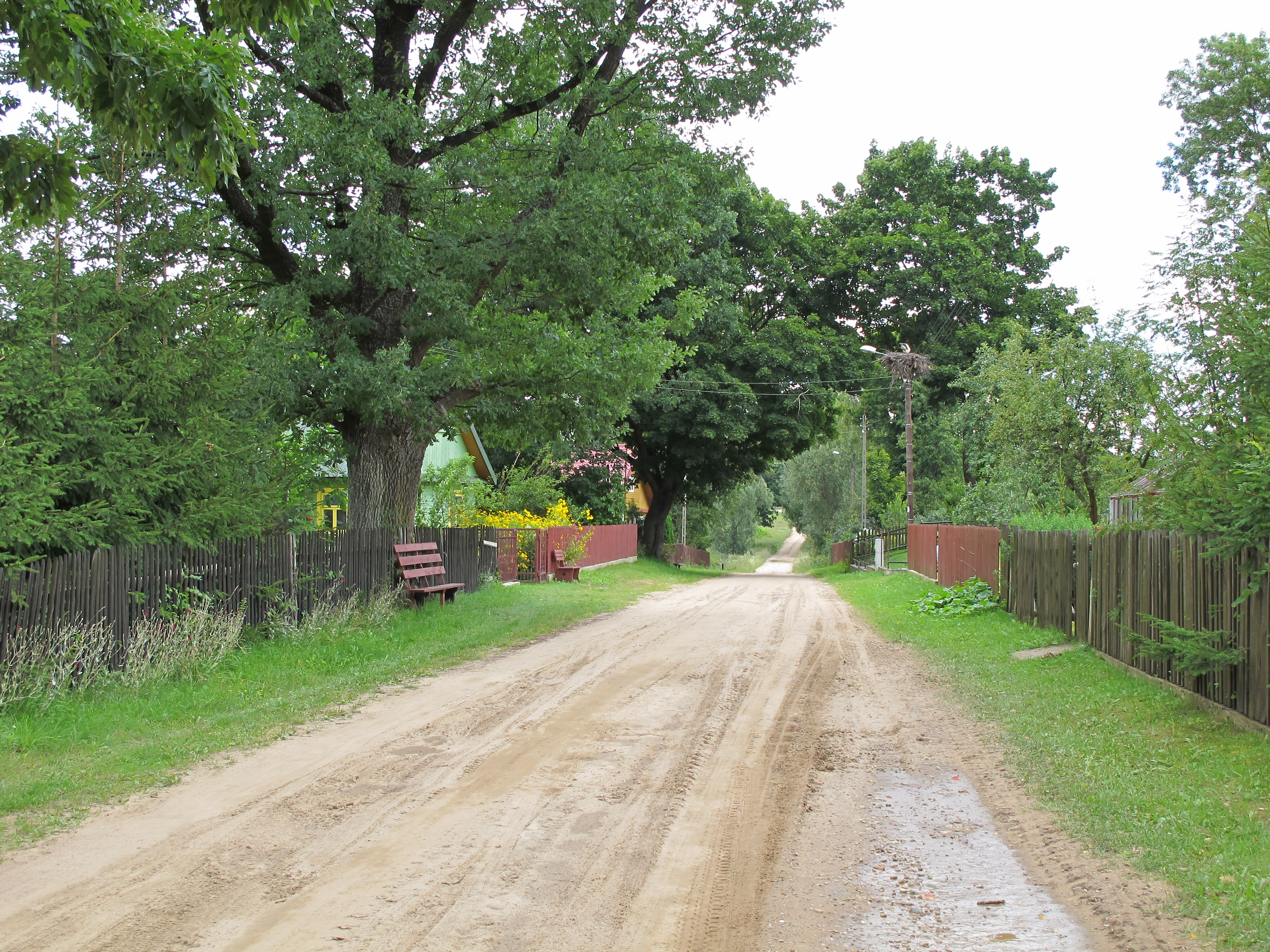
- Street in the village

- Location within Poland
- Coordinates: 53°14′05″N 23°49′05″E
- Country: Poland
- Voivodeship: Podlaskie
- County: Sokółka
- Gmina: Krynki

Nowa Świdziałówka [ˈnɔva ɕfid͡ʑaˈwufka] is a village in the administrative district of Gmina Krynki, within Sokółka County, Podlaskie Voivodeship, in north-eastern Poland, close to the border with Belarus.
