= Trejgle =

- Settlement
- Location within Poland
- Coordinates: 53°13′29″N 23°47′59″E
- Country: Poland
- Voivodeship: Podlaskie
- County: Sokółka
- Gmina: Krynki

Trejgle [ˈtrɛi̯ɡlɛ] is a settlement in the administrative district of Gmina Krynki, within Sokółka County, Podlaskie Voivodeship, in north-eastern Poland, close to the border with Belarus. The climate is cold and temperate.
