= Kundzicze, Gmina Krynki =

Kundzicze
- Village
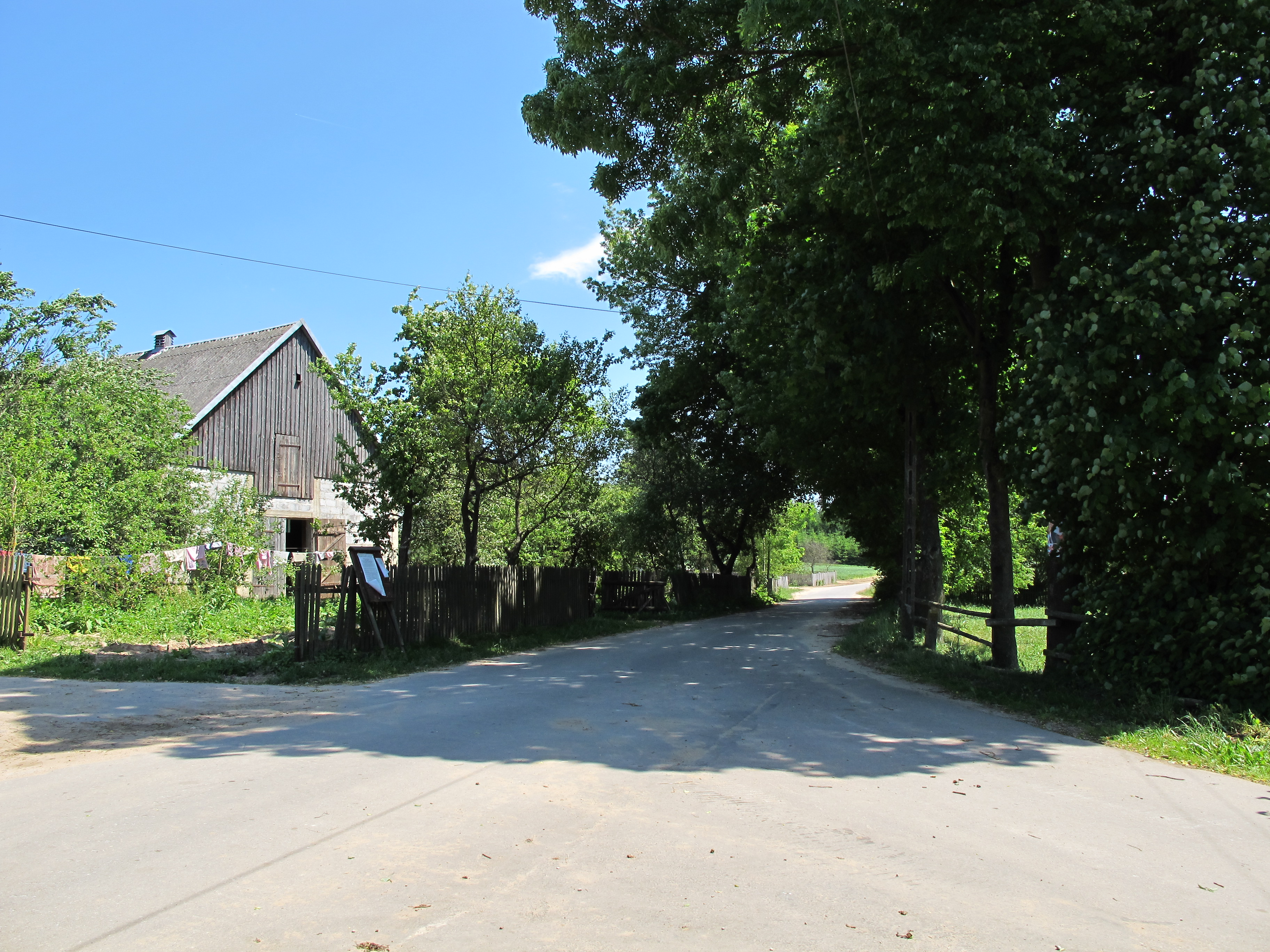

- Location within Poland
- Coordinates: 53°12′43.09″N 23°46′35.31″E
- Country: Poland
- Voivodeship: Podlaskie
- County: Sokółka
- Gmina: Krynki

Kundzicze [kunˈd͡ʑit͡ʂɛ] is a village in the administrative district of Gmina Krynki, within Sokółka County, Podlaskie Voivodeship, in north-eastern Poland, close to the border with Belarus.
