= Białogorce =

- Village
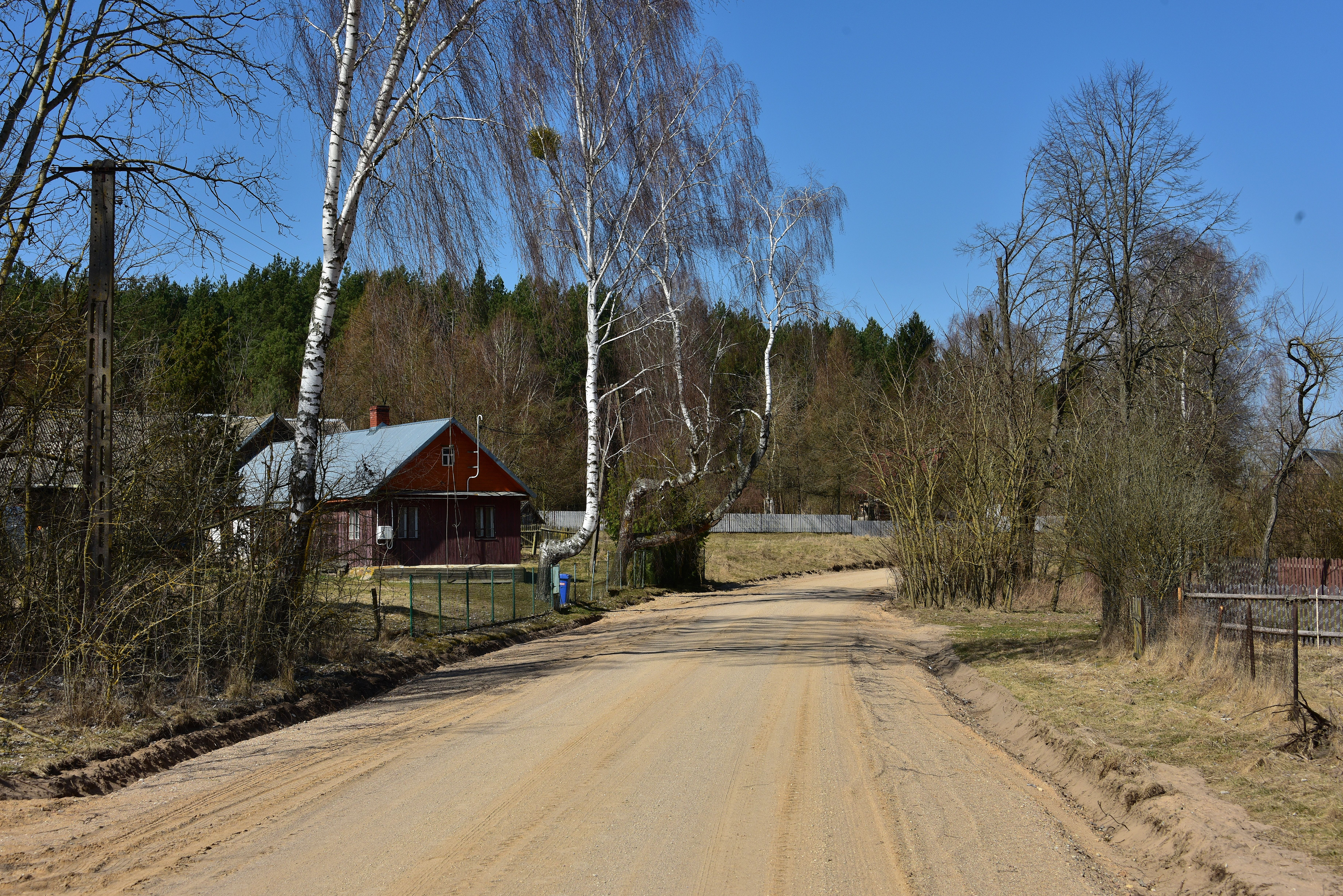
- Street of Białogorce

- Location within Poland
- Coordinates: 53°12′56″N 23°48′49″E
- Country: Poland
- Voivodeship: Podlaskie
- County: Sokółka
- Gmina: Krynki

Białogorce [bjawɔˈɡɔrt͡sɛ] is a village in the administrative district of Gmina Krynki, within Sokółka County, Podlaskie Voivodeship, in north-eastern Poland, close to the border with Belarus.
