= Podlipki =

- Village
- Location within Poland
- Coordinates: 53°12′43″N 23°39′36″E
- Country: Poland
- Voivodeship: Podlaskie
- County: Sokółka
- Gmina: Krynki
- Population: 40

Podlipki [pɔdˈlipki] is a village in the administrative district of Gmina Krynki, within Sokółka County, Podlaskie Voivodeship, in north-eastern Poland, close to the border with Belarus.
