= Szaciły, Sokółka County =

Szaciły
- Village
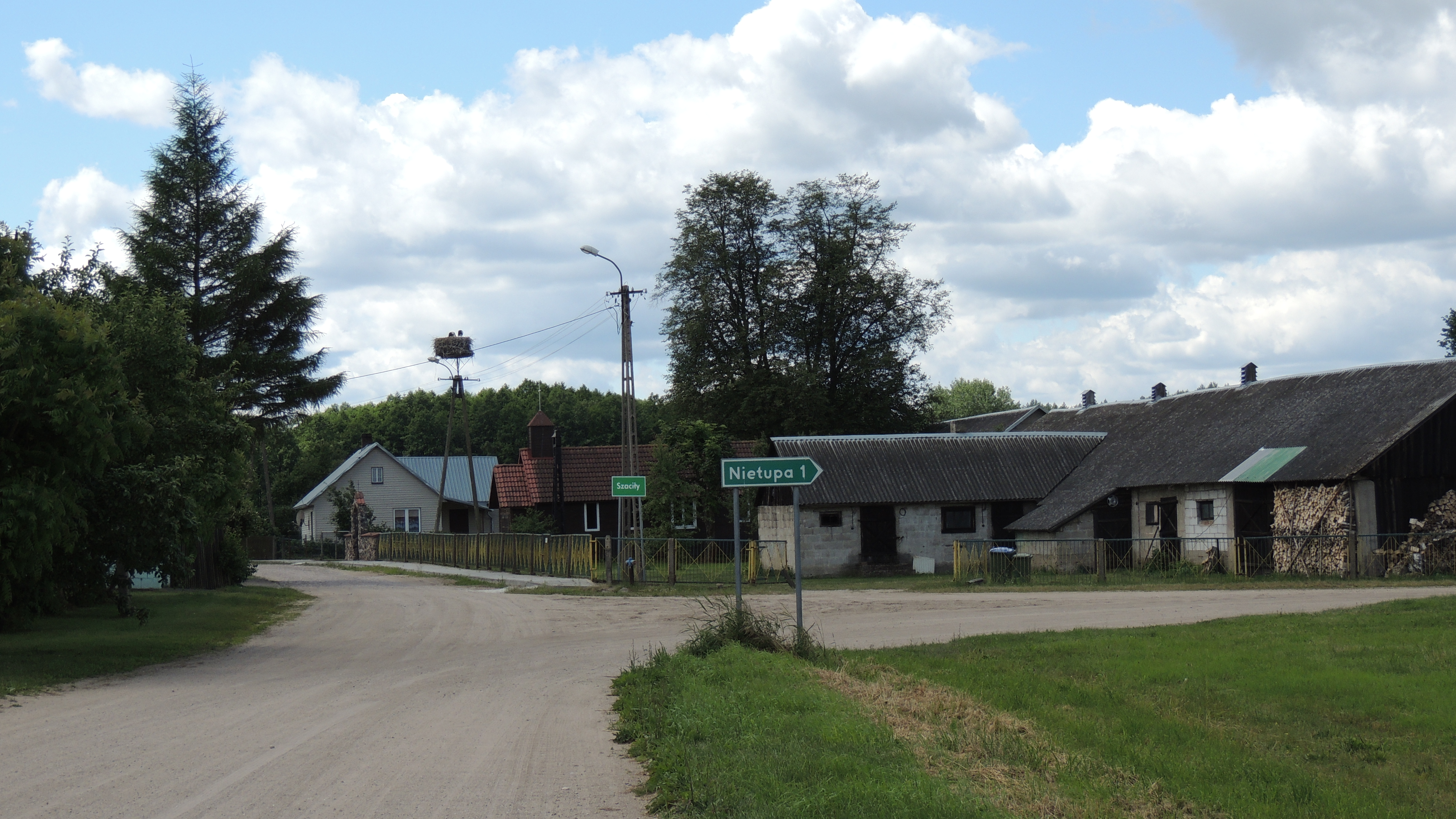

- Location within Poland
- Coordinates: 53°10′N 23°44′E
- Country: Poland
- Voivodeship: Podlaskie
- County: Sokółka
- Gmina: Krynki
- Population (approx.): 12

Szaciły [ʂaˈt͡ɕiwɨ] is a village in the administrative district of Gmina Krynki, within Sokółka County, Podlaskie Voivodeship, in north-eastern Poland, close to the border with Belarus.
