= Górany =

- Village
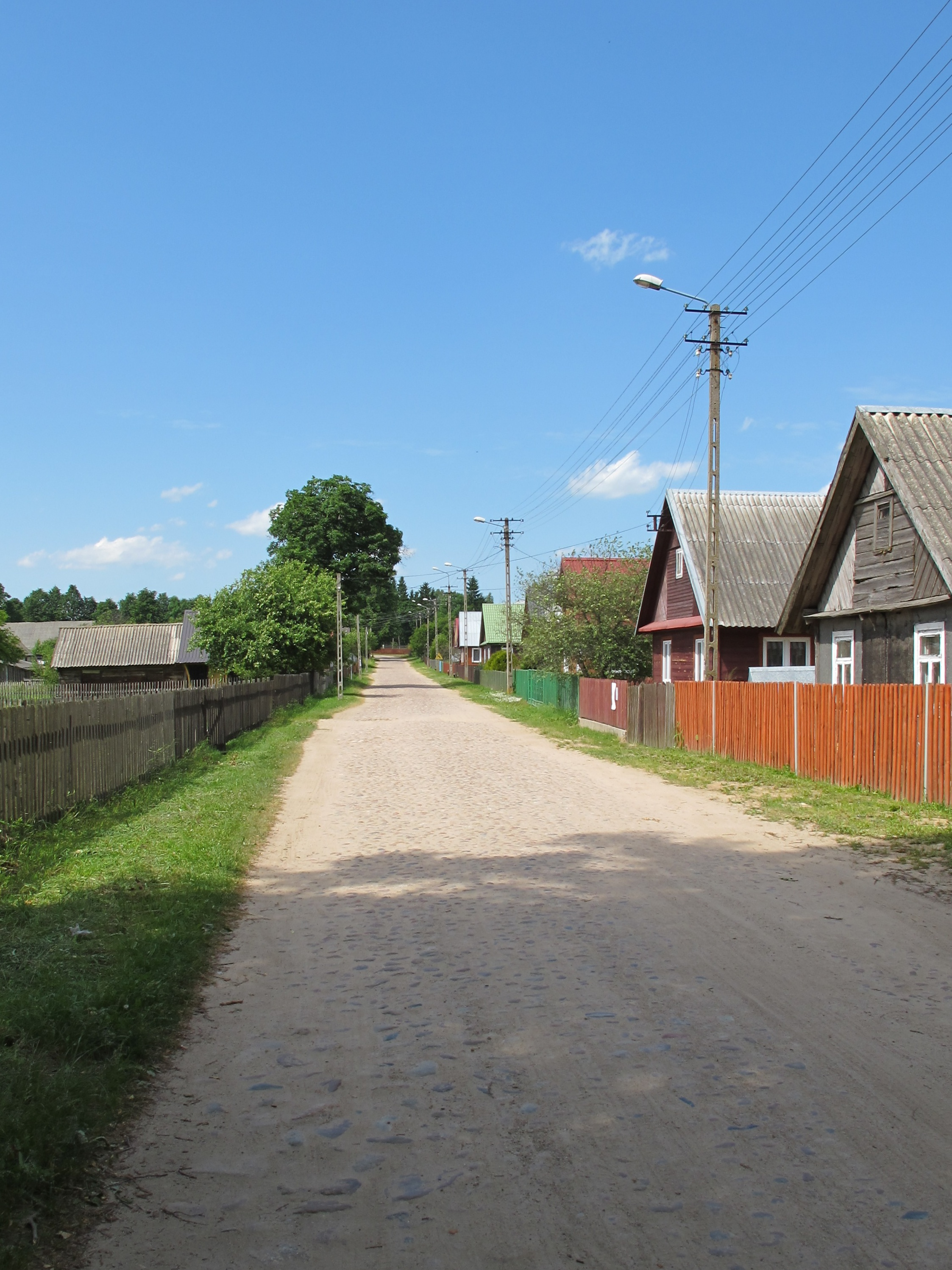

- Location within Poland
- Coordinates: 53°12′54.66″N 23°40′41.82″E
- Country: Poland
- Voivodeship: Podlaskie
- County: Sokółka
- Gmina: Krynki

Górany [ɡuˈranɨ] is a village in the administrative district of Gmina Krynki, within Sokółka County, Podlaskie Voivodeship, in north-eastern Poland, close to the border with Belarus.
