= Ozierany Małe =

- Village
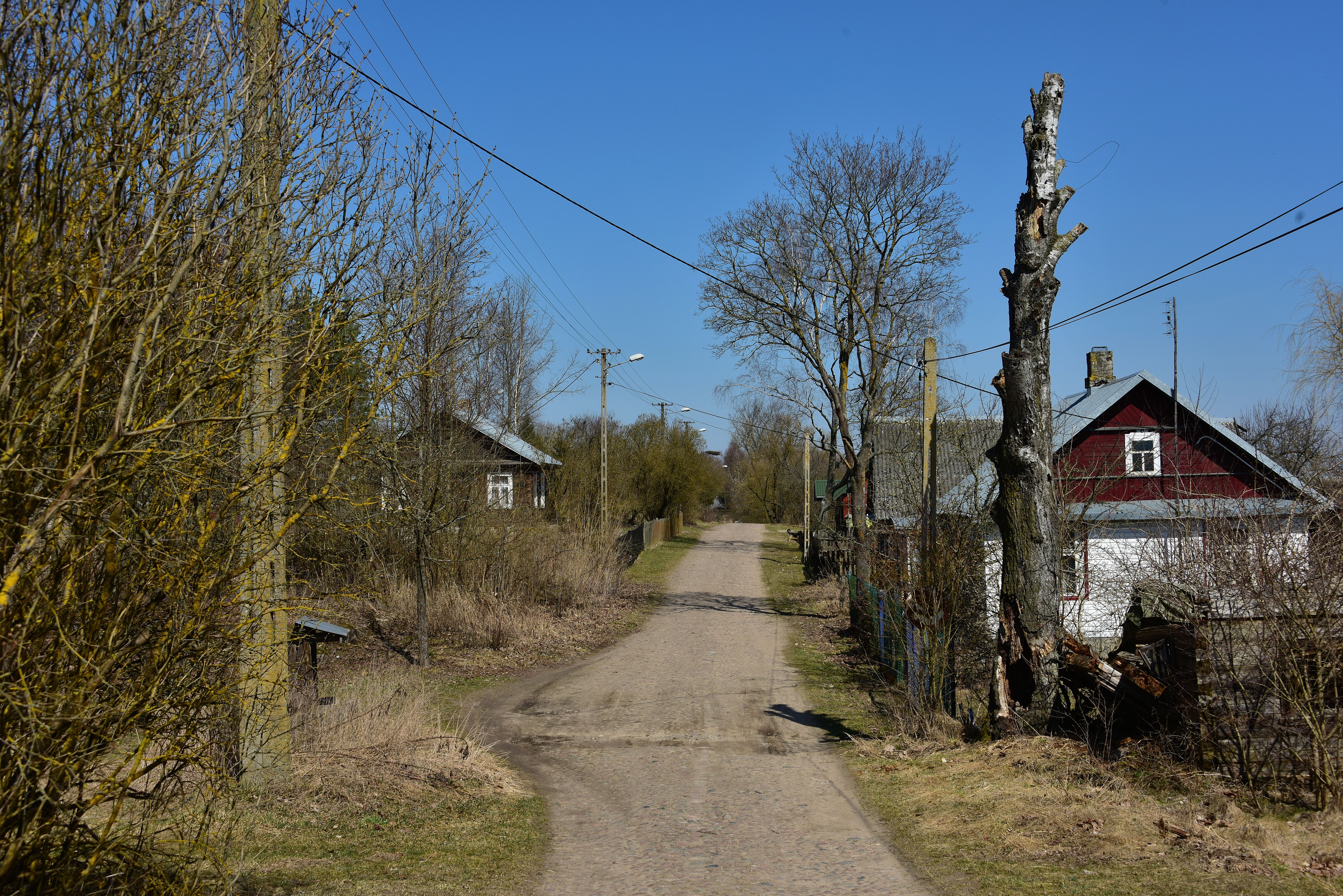

- Location within Poland
- Coordinates: 53°13′N 23°52′E
- Country: Poland
- Voivodeship: Podlaskie
- County: Sokółka
- Gmina: Krynki

Ozierany Małe [ɔʑɛˈranɨ ˈmawɛ] is a village in the administrative district of Gmina Krynki, within Sokółka County, Podlaskie Voivodeship, in north-eastern Poland, close to the border with Belarus.
