= Nietupa-Kolonia =

- Village
- Location within Poland
- Coordinates: 53°14′02″N 23°49′02″E
- Country: Poland
- Voivodeship: Podlaskie
- County: Sokółka
- Gmina: Krynki

Nietupa-Kolonia [ɲɛˈtupa kɔˈlɔɲa] is a village in the administrative district of Gmina Krynki, within Sokółka County, Podlaskie Voivodeship, in north-eastern Poland, close to the border with Belarus.
