= Rachowik =

- Settlement
- Location within Poland
- Coordinates: 53°15′20″N 23°43′33″E
- Country: Poland
- Voivodeship: Podlaskie
- County: Sokółka
- Gmina: Krynki

Rachowik [raˈxɔvik] is a settlement in the administrative district of Gmina Krynki, within Sokółka County, Podlaskie Voivodeship, in north-eastern Poland, close to the border with Belarus.
