= Gmina Krynki =

Gmina Krynki Krynki Commune
- Gmina
- Flag Coat of arms

- Gmina Krynki within the Sokółka County
- Coordinates (Krynki): 53°16′N 23°47′E
- Country: Poland
- Voivodeship: Podlaskie
- County: Sokółka
- Seat: Krynki

Area
  - Total: 165.91 km^{2} (64.06 sq mi)

Population (2006)
  - Total: 3,423
  - Density: 20.63/km^{2} (53.44/sq mi)

Gmina Krynki is an urban-rural gmina (administrative district) in Sokółka County, Podlaskie Voivodeship, in north-eastern Poland, on the border with Belarus. Its seat is the town of Krynki, which lies approximately 24 kilometres (15 mi) south-east of Sokółka and 45 km (28 mi) east of the regional capital Białystok. (Krynki gained town status on 1 January 2009 – prior to that the district was classed as a rural gmina.)

The gmina covers an area of 165.91 square kilometres (64.1 sq mi), and as of 2006 its total population is 3,423, out of which the population of Krynki is 2,709.

The gmina contains part of the protected area called Knyszyń Forest Landscape Park.

== Villages ==
Apart from the town of Krynki, the gmina contains the villages and settlements of Aleksandrówka, Białogorce, Borsukowizna, Chłodne Włóki, Ciumicze, Górany, Górka, Jamasze, Jurowlany, Kłyszawka, Kruszyniany, Kundzicze, Łapicze, Leszczany, Łosiniany, Nietupa, Nietupa-Kolonia, Nietupskie, Nowa Grzybowszczyzna, Nowa Świdziałówka, Ostrów Południowy, Ozierany Małe, Ozierany Wielkie, Ozierskie, Plebanowo, Podlipki, Podszaciły, Rachowik, Rudaki, Sanniki, Seroczyńszczyzna, Słobódka, Stara Grzybowszczyzna, Studzianka, Szaciły, Trejgle and Żylicze.

== Neighbouring gminas ==
Gmina Krynki is bordered by the gminas of Gródek and Szudziałowo. It also borders Belarus.
