= Stara Grzybowszczyzna =

- Village
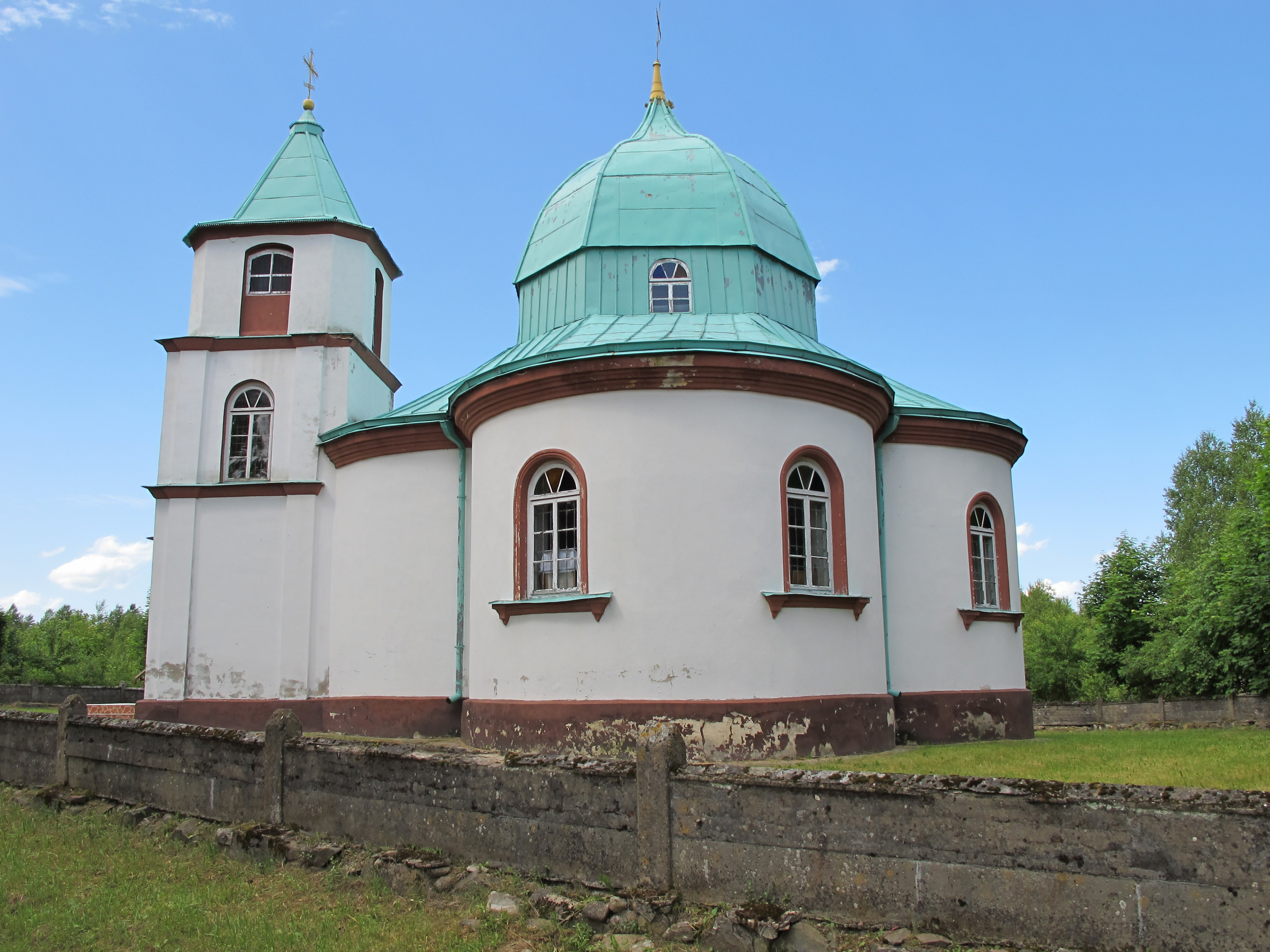
- Orthodox church in Stara Grzybowszczyzna

- Location within Poland
- Coordinates: 53°12′N 23°42′E
- Country: Poland
- Voivodeship: Podlaskie
- County: Sokółka
- Gmina: Krynki
- Population: 20

Stara Grzybowszczyzna [ˈstara ɡʐɨbɔfʂˈt͡ʂɨzna] is a village in the administrative district of Gmina Krynki, within Sokółka County, Podlaskie Voivodeship, in north-eastern Poland, close to the border with Belarus.

The Orthodox church of Saint John the Baptist, founded by local cult leader Eliasz Klimowicz, is located near the village.
