= Ciełuszki =

- Village
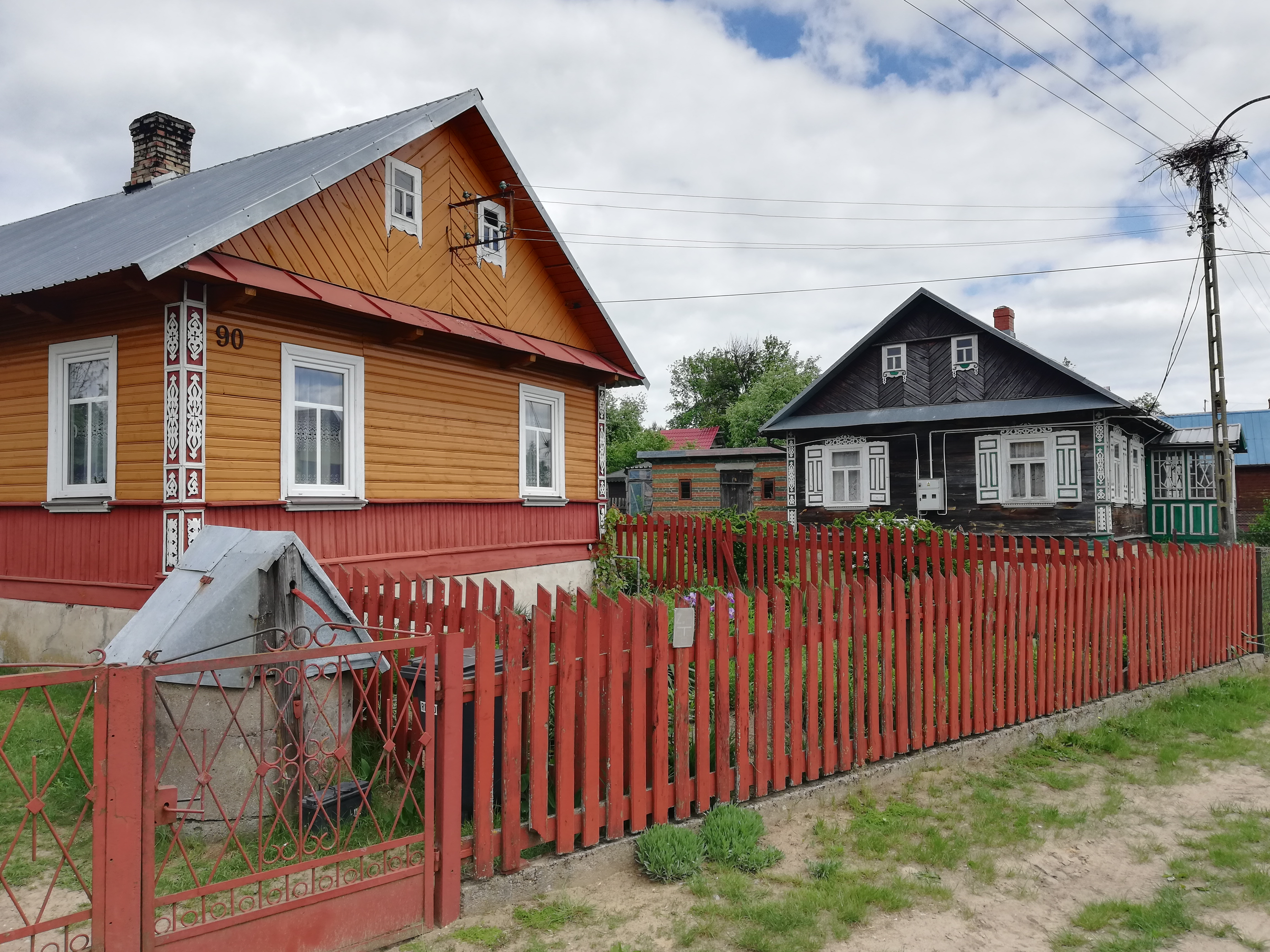

- Location within Poland
- Coordinates: 52°54′N 23°22′E
- Country: Poland
- Voivodeship: Podlaskie
- County: Białystok
- Gmina: Zabłudów
- Time zone: UTC+1 (CET)
  - Summer (DST): UTC+2 (CEST)

Ciełuszki [t͡ɕɛˈwuʂki] is a village in the administrative district of Gmina Zabłudów, within Białystok County, Podlaskie Voivodeship, in north-eastern Poland.

== History ==
Three Polish citizens were murdered by Nazi Germany in the village during World War II.
