= Sanniki, Sokółka County =

Village in Gmina Krynki, Poland

Sanniki
- Village
- Location within Poland
- Coordinates: 53°13′17″N 23°38′27″E
- Country: Poland
- Voivodeship: Podlaskie
- County: Sokółka
- Gmina: Krynki

Sanniki [sanˈniki] is a village in the administrative district of Gmina Krynki, within Sokółka County, Podlaskie Voivodeship, in north-eastern Poland, close to the border with Belarus.
