= Leszczany, Gmina Krynki =

Leszczany
- Village
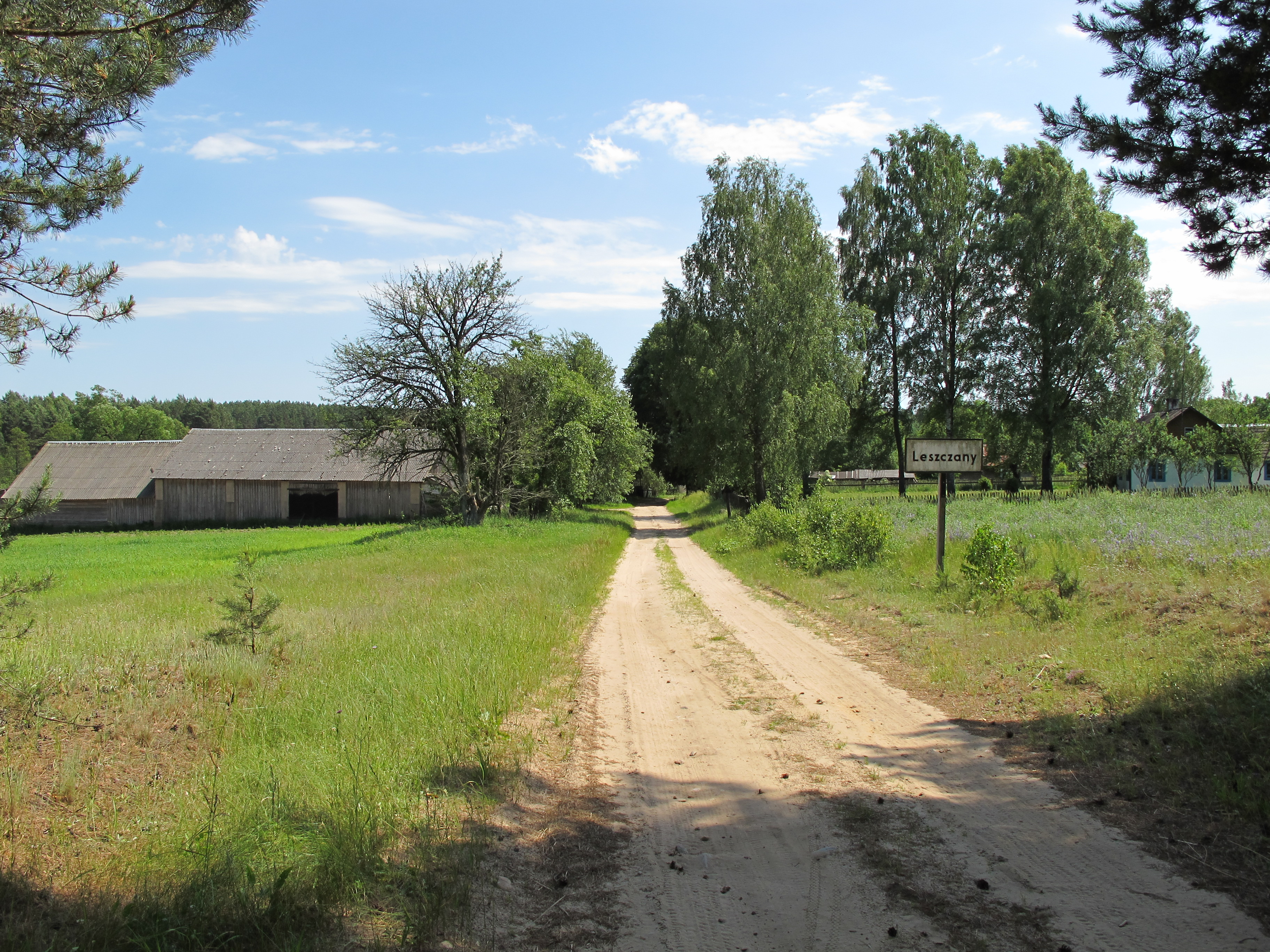

- Location within Poland
- Coordinates: 53°11′54.14″N 23°43′21.41″E
- Country: Poland
- Voivodeship: Podlaskie
- County: Sokółka
- Gmina: Krynki

Leszczany [lɛʂˈt͡ʂanɨ] is a village in the administrative district of Gmina Krynki, within Sokółka County, Podlaskie Voivodeship, in north-eastern Poland, close to the border with Belarus.
