= Belarus–European Union border crisis =

2021 migrant crisis on the borders of Poland, Lithuania and Latvia with Belarus

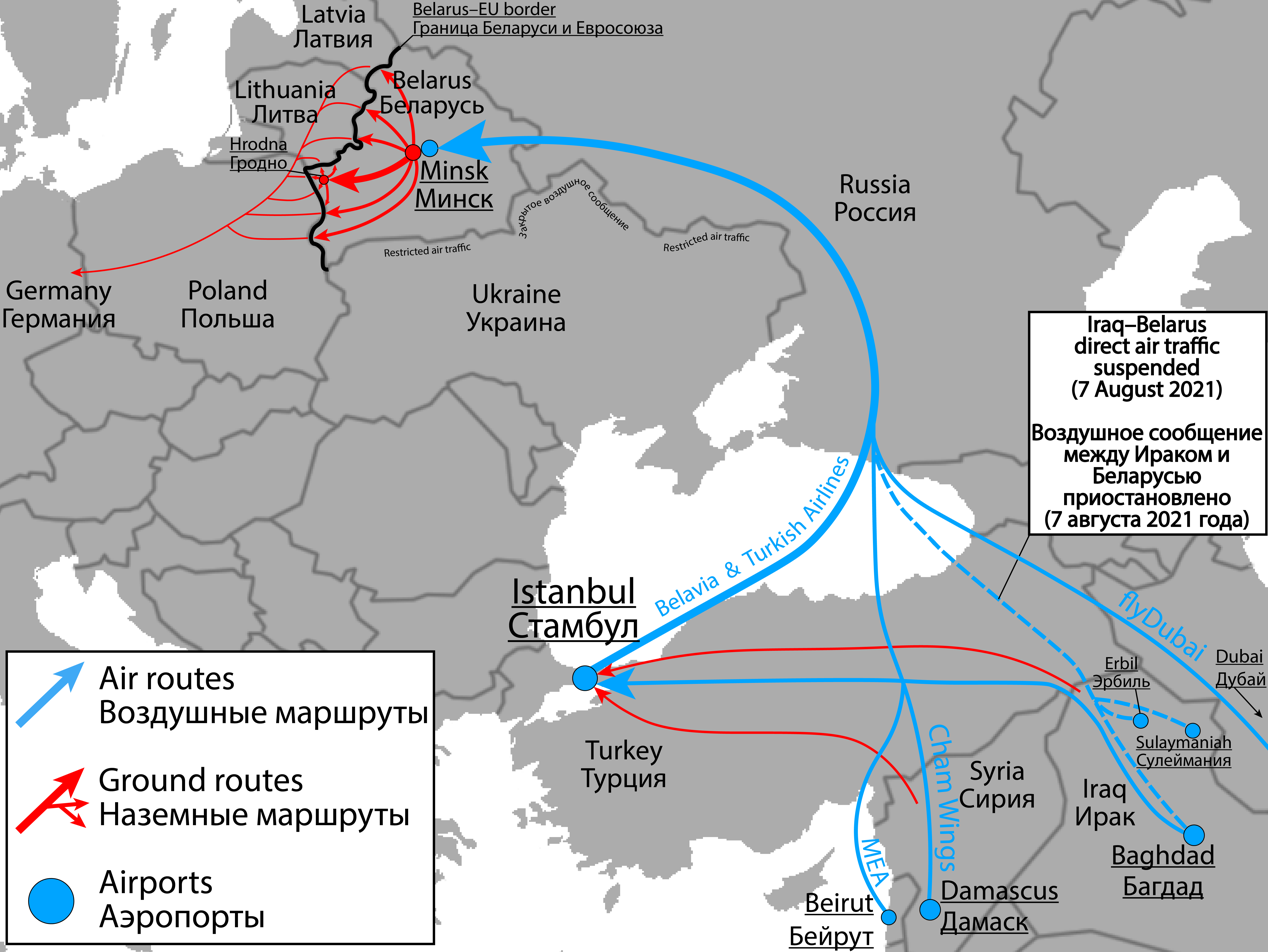
- Map showing main routes of illegal migrants to the Belarus–EU border
- Date: 7 July 2021
- Location: Belarus–EU border (Belarus; Poland, Lithuania, Latvia)
- Caused by: Deterioration in Belarus–EU relations following the 2020 Belarusian election and 2020–2021 protests; Sanctions against Belarus following the Ryanair Flight 4978 incident; Forced repatriation of sprinter Krystsina Tsimanouskaya
- Result: Belarus–Poland border barrier Belarus–Lithuania border barrier

Parties
Belarus State-sponsored migrant groups (mostly from the MENA region) Supported by: Russia	European Union: Lithuania; Latvia; Poland (from 6 August 2021); Estonia (from 22 November 2021); Supported by: United Kingdom (from 19 November 2021)

Lead figures
Alexander Lukashenko; Roman Golovchenko; Vladimir Putin; Mikhail Mishustin	Gitanas Nauseda; Ingrida Šimonytė; Egils Levits; Krišjānis Kariņš; Andrzej Duda; Mateusz Morawiecki; Alar Karis; Kaja Kallas; Boris Johnson

Number
Unknown	Poland: 15,000 troops; Lithuania: Unknown; Latvia: Unknown; Estonia: 150 engineering troops deployed to Poland; United Kingdom: 155 engineering troops deployed to Poland; Frontex: 100 officers, 30 patrol cars, 2 helicopters in Lithuania

Casualties and losses
(Belarus) Belarusian forces: 2 dead (not in action) (Russia) Russian forces: 2 dead (not in action)	(Poland) Polish forces: 3 dead (2 not in action); 1 defected 83+ injured Lithuania Ministry of the Interior: 1 dead (not in action)
- about 50 migrants dead, 217 missing

In August 2021, the government of Belarus began sponsoring an influx of migrants, mostly from the Middle East and North Africa, to the borders of Lithuania, Poland and Latvia. Although Belarus denied involvement, both the European Union and independent observers viewed it as hybrid warfare undertaken in response to the deterioration in Belarus–European Union relations following the 2020 Belarusian presidential election and the 2020–2021 Belarusian protests. Between August and December 2021, tens of thousands of unauthorized border crossing attempts were recorded, peaking in October. At least 20 migrants died in the following winter due to the harsh weather and abuse from border authorities. Attempted border crossings fell sharply the following year, but never returned to their pre-crisis levels. In the spring of 2024, numbers began rising again, although they remain well below those seen in the peak of the crisis in 2021.

The crisis began sometime around 7 July 2021, when Belarus's president Alexander Lukashenko threatened to "flood" the EU with "drugs and migrants". Belarusian authorities and state-controlled travel agencies, together with some airlines operating in the Middle East, started advertising tours to Belarus and falsely promoting opportunities of easy entry into the European Union. Those who arrived in Belarus, most of whom were trying to reach Germany, were then given instructions about how and where to cross the EU's border, and what to tell the border guards on the other side of it. Migrants said that Belarus provided them with wire cutters and axes to cut through border barriers and enter the EU. However, those who did not manage to cross were often forced to stay on the border by Belarusian authorities, who were accused of assaulting migrants who failed to get across. Belarus has repeatedly refused entry to Polish convoys carrying humanitarian aid for migrants.

Poland, Lithuania, and Latvia each declared states of emergency and announced their intentions to build border walls. The EU sent supporting officers and patrol cars to Lithuania, and 12 EU governments stated their support for a physical barrier along the border. After the EU refused to finance protective structures on the external borders, Poland and Lithuania completed their barriers on the border with Belarus on their own.

Human Rights Watch accused Belarusian authorities of manufacturing the crisis and state-level mass exploitation of migrants, making Belarusian border guards responsible for violence, inhuman and degrading treatment and use of coercion against migrants. Other human rights organizations and academics voiced concerns over the use of migrant pushbacks by Lithuanian, Latvian and Polish border guards, the denial of the possibility to lodge an asylum claim, as well as inadequate food, water, and shelter for the migrants, the latter of which was a subject of a European Court of Human Rights (ECHR) order. Polish officials have additionally been criticised for not allowing journalists, doctors, and non-governmental organizations to the border.

== Background ==
In 2020, Alexander Lukashenko, who has ruled Belarus since July 1994, claimed victory in that year's presidential election, which was widely considered rigged by European democracies and independent observers. The official results contained implausible discrepancies, particularly at the nationwide level but also in many individual electoral districts. Based on exit polls, Lukashenko might have lost the elections to Sviatlana Tsikhanouskaya. The Lukashenko regime had been widely accused of electoral fraud in previous elections, including by Organization for Security and Co-operation in Europe (OSCE) observers, who were often restricted from monitoring election conduct.

The election resulted in Belarus' largest-ever protests, which were violently repressed by the government. Around 30,000 people were arrested, with several deaths and thousands of documented cases of torture in custody. Most Western countries refused to recognize the result of the election. The European Union imposed sanctions on Belarusian officials in response to the electoral fraud and the violent quashing of the subsequent protests.

Relations deteriorated further in the following year in May 2021, when Belarus intercepted a Polish commercial airplane overflying its territory on a regularly scheduled passenger flight and arrested two of its passengers, opposition activist and journalist Roman Protasevich and his girlfriend Sofia Sapega. In response, the United States, European Union, the United Kingdom and Canada announced further sanctions against members of the government of Belarus as well as Belarusian state-owned companies. The sanctions included individual travel bans for government members, asset freezes and a ban on Belarusian aircraft from flying into EU airspace.

At the 2020 Summer Olympics in Tokyo in August 2021, Poland granted asylum to Belarusian sprinter Krystsina Tsimanouskaya, which led to further Belarus-EU tensions. Tsimanouskaya had criticized the management style of her coaches, who then tried to force her back to Belarus; fearing retaliation at home, she refused to board her return flight.

== Key features ==
In May 2021, Lithuania began reporting a sudden increase in the number of irregular border crossings from Belarus. By June, Lithuania had detained over 600 people trying to enter the country (for comparison, 81 people were apprehended in the entire previous year). At the same time, Lukashenko began threatening to allow human traffickers and drug smugglers into Europe, later also implying he might provide migrants with weapons.

Iraqi TV stations repeatedly broadcast a statement by Lukashenko that Belarus would no longer prevent migrants from crossing into the European Union. (Note: Original quote: "As we were told by Iraqi citizen Amin (name changed), Alexander Lukashenko's speeches that Belarus would no longer obstruct refugees heading to the EU were broadcast for several days by the Iraqi state TV" («Как рассказал нам житель Ирака Амин (имя изменено), высказывания Александра Лукашенко о том, что Беларусь перестанет препятствовать беженцам, стремящимся в ЕС, по иракскому государственному телевидению крутили несколько дней подряд»).) Syrian media also widely reported on the new "policy". Belarusian authorities encouraged the impression that Belarus was a convenient gateway into Europe.

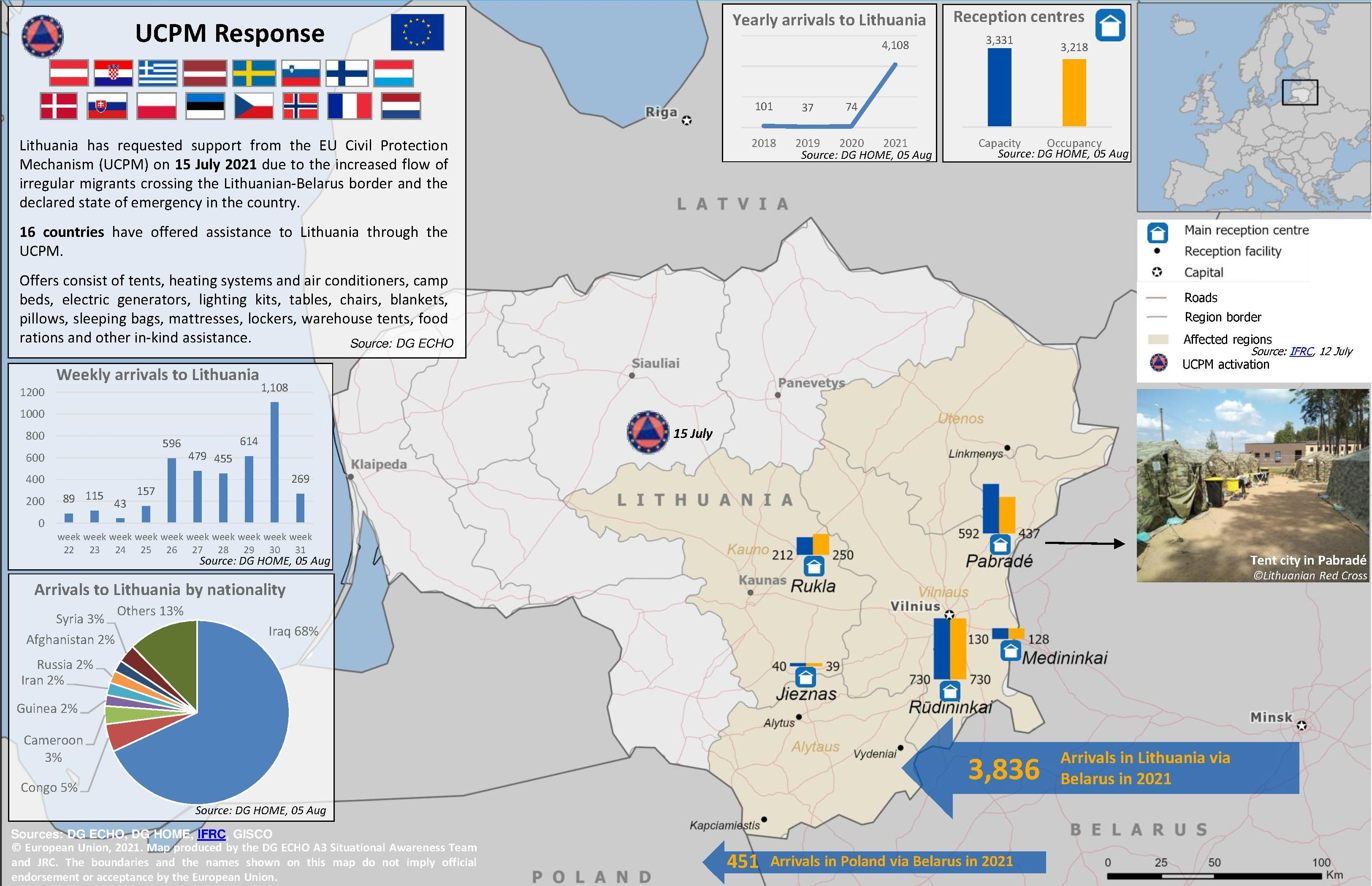
Migrant influx into Lithuania provoked by the border crisis

Ethnic and religious minorities from Iraq (Kurds and Yazidis) were the most frequent category of migrants. According to a CBC investigation, many fled persecution from the Islamic State, but also many migrants come from the Kurdistan Region, which is among the safest in the Middle East; they sought a better life abroad due to the lack of opportunities in the region. Thus most of the migrants were Iraqi Kurds but also included numbers of Iraqi Arabs, Syrians, Yemenites, and some from other regions in both Asia and Africa, including from Afghanistan and Cameroon, notwithstanding a number of Russians.

=== Role of airlines and tourist agencies ===
By mid-summer 2021, reports began emerging that Iraqi travel agencies were organizing "tourist trips" to Belarus at significantly reduced prices. Belarus' visa rules were also made much looser in August, allowing citizens of Middle Eastern countries to be issued a Belarusian visa on arrival in Minsk. Belarusian travel agencies began promoting "tours" to Belarus from Iraq.

At the same time, the weekly number of flights to Minsk increased significantly. Iraqi Airways doubled the frequency of its Baghdad-Minsk flights; Belavia, Belarus's state-owned airline, also provided more offers to Middle East flyers. A journalist from Komsomolskaya Pravda noted that while the flight from Baghdad to Minsk carried about 180 people, only 5 people flew in the opposite direction. On 2 August, Iraqi Airways announced three new direct flights to Minsk from the Iraqi cities of Basra, Erbil and Sulaymaniyah. Another major air route was the Istanbul—Minsk flight operated by Belavia and Turkish Airlines. On 28 October, Syrian Cham Wings Airlines, after having made several charter flights, launched a daily connection from Damascus to the Belarusian capital.

A number of travel agencies in Belarus are believed to have been instructed by the government to organize "Belarus tours" for Iraqis. The most prominent was the Belarusian state-owned Tsentrkurort Tsentrkurort (Russian: Центркурорт), which is subordinated to the presidential administration of Belarus. For instance, an investigation by the Russian organization Dossier and German newspaper Der Spiegel revealed that Tsentrkurort was collaborating with several Belarusian and Iraqi travel agencies to facilitate visas for "hunting tours" in Belarus, as well as handling travel arrangements such as flights and accommodation. (Note: Tsentrkurort who is subordinated to the presidential administration of Belarus recommended the intermediary companies to check into hotels owned by the presidential administration: Minsk, Yubileyny, Prezident, Planeta.) The travel agency Oskartur (Russian: Оскартур) was also heavily involved in this particular scheme. The pretext "hunting tours" may have been chosen because hunting was exempted from COVID-19 pandemic travel restrictions in place at the time. It was also reported that several travel agencies, including Oskartur, were given full access to the international zone of Minsk airport and delegated the power to issue visas, normally reserved for border guards. These companies were suspected to have received special privileges from airport staff and authorities, as other travel agencies were not allowed to provide similar services.

=== On the border ===
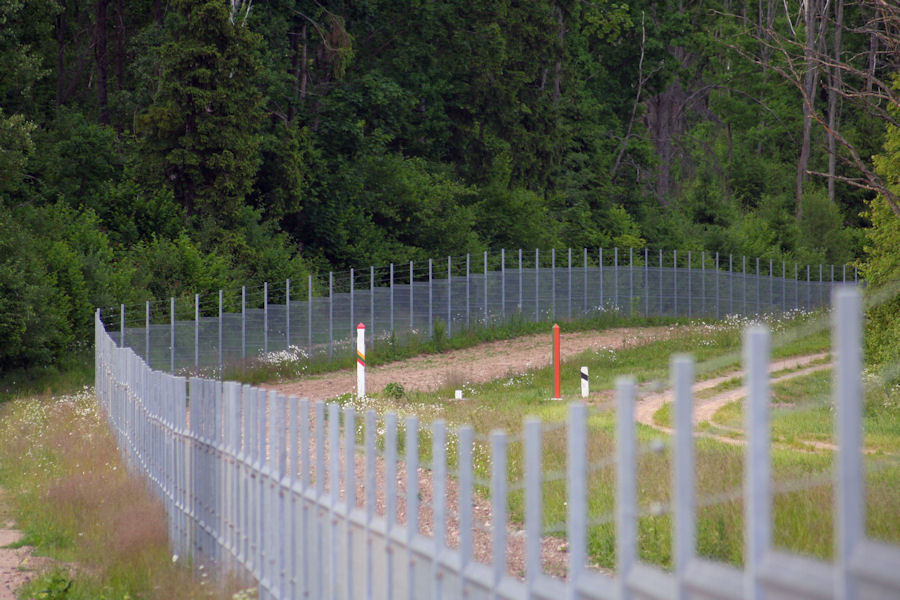
Border markers with a fence on the Lithuanian side in 2015, before the construction of a new barrier.

According to the investigation of LRT, the Lithuanian state media outlet, Iraqi Kurds claimed that they were told that entering the European Union via Belarus was legal. After a few days in Belarusian hotels, migrants were collected, taken to the border and instructed to proceed on foot, believing that a car would be waiting for them in Lithuania. It was reported that they paid up to €15,000 for travel and tourist visas as well as US$3,000–4,000 deposits. According to the investigation of Belarusian news server reform.by, people from the Middle East believe that they should destroy their passport in order to avoid deportation from the EU. Belsat TV journalists found groups in social networks and Telegram groups which provide help and advice for those who cross the Belarus–Lithuania border. Videos of people crossing fences on the Lithuanian side were published there. Migrants repeatedly used the cover story that they are students from Belarusian universities.

=== Role of Belarusian border guards ===
Belarus state involvement was suspected from the very beginning of the crisis. Lukashenko personally confirmed that the involvement of Belarusian border troops is "absolutely possible" shortly after numerous videos appeared online showing Belarusian border guards assisting migrants in crossing the border and preventing them from returning to Belarus. In July, reports emerged that Belarusian border guards had been instructed to turn a blind eye to undocumented migrants and stop communicating with their Lithuanian counterparts. In August, footage from a Frontex helicopter showed a group of migrants accompanied by a Belarusian border guard vehicle. According to both the Lithuanian government and reports from migrants themselves, some of the smugglers transporting and advising migrants were being paid by Belarus. Most often Belarusian soldiers were directly involved themselves. In November, several recordings appeared on social media showing Belarusian soldiers shooting near immigrants in order to intimidate them, recorded from both the Polish and Belarusian sides of the border. The Times reported about migrants brought to the border at gunpoint or trucked by people wearing balaclavas; the migrants were then additionally given planks to cross a small border river called Svislach. Later in the crisis, the migrants would be given tools to destroy the border infrastructure. Exiled politician Pavel Latushko claimed that the Belarusian military trained several war veterans from Iraq and Afghanistan to carry out attacks on borders and inside the EU. It was stressed that Belarus previously received significant financial assistance to strengthen the border: in 2001–2012, Belarus received €47.5 million for "integrated border management" and €21 million additionally for related regional projects. After 2012, Belarus received at least €15 million for border-related issues (excluding customs). In particular, EU funded the reequipment of Belarusian border infrastructure which was considered a "significant and effective" help, paid for special BOMBEL project against illegal migration and other projects (AENEAS and AWABEL).

Illegal migrants had full permissiveness to violate several Belarusian laws without any punishment. Belarusian lawyer Mikhail Kiryliuk suggested that the migrants made at least five violations of the Code about administrative offenses (articles 11.3, 16.17, 18.20, 18.29, 24.23) and three violations of the Criminal Code (293, 371, 126). He also suggested that inaction of the Belarusian military who stood just behind the migrants attacking Polish border guards can be treated as a violation of the Criminal Code.

Smugglers pick those migrants who managed to cross the border in the EU and transfer them westwards (usually to Germany). While human trafficking is a crime, Polish authorities have encountered misinformation suggesting that Poland allowed such operations to take place. Up to 4 November 2021, 235 people have been detained in Podlaskie Voivodeship alone due to human trafficking charges since the crisis on the Polish border began. However, those migrants who fail to cross the border are often prohibited to return home from Belarus and are forced to stay on the border (one of the tactics used by the Belarusian military was compared to anti-retreat forces). A group of Yazidi migrants complained to reporters that they were beaten by Belarusian border guards when they tried to return to Iraq after an unsuccessful attempt to sneak to Poland. The guards, according to these people, forced them to stay on the border. An Iraqi Kurd who decided to seek political asylum in Belarus after unsuccessful attempt to sneak to Poland claimed that the Belarusian police used a stun gun and forced him to leave the country after he declared his wish to stay in Belarus as a legal refugee. According to the Human Rights Watch research, Belarusian border guards gathered those migrants who were pushed back from Poland to Belarus detaining and abusing them in special sites and not letting them to return to Minsk or their home.

The main purpose of the Lukashenko-led crisis is, according to Maksim Samorukov of the Carnegie Moscow Center, the attempt to legitimize his rigged reelection in 2020 and to lift sanctions by showing his ability to stop the influx of migrants.

== Lithuania ==
Lithuania has a 680-kilometre-long (420 mi) border with Belarus. At the beginning of the crisis, the border was described as insufficiently protected, often with low wooden fences or small ditches. According to public figures, the country had 81 refugees in 2020. In the years preceding the crisis, the number of illegal migrants crossing into Lithuania via Belarus averaged around 70. However, in June 2021, the number of illegal migrants who were detained rose to around 470, rising to thousands the next month.

Illegal migrants crossing the Belarus–Lithuania border
Year	Number
2015	280
2017	72
2018	104
2019	46
2020	81
2021 (June)	470
2021 (late July)	ca. 2,600
2021 (by 7 August)	4,112
2021 (by 9 November)	4,220

Illegal migrants in Lithuania by nationality, 2021 (as of 9 November 2021)
Nationality	Region of origin	Number
Iraq	Western Asia	2,811
Republic of the Congo	Central Africa	204
Syria	Western Asia	147
Cameroon	West-Central Africa	134
Afghanistan	South-Central Asia	101
Russia	Eurasia	93
Belarus	Eastern Europe	91
Iran	Western Asia	87
Other		444
Total		4,220
Source: Department of Statistics (Lithuania)

Lithuanian officials said that Belarusian authorities were encouraging illegal migration from Iraq and Syria to Lithuania by organizing groups of refugees and helping them cross the Belarusian-Lithuanian border. European officials blamed Belarusian travel agencies for helping illegal migrants. The majority of migrants were from Iraq, but citizens of other Middle Eastern and African countries were also among them. Their final destination is usually not Lithuania, but Germany.

Belarusian authorities were harshly critical of the EU's decisions. On 28 June, Belarus unilaterally withdrew from its readmission agreement with the EU. The Belarusian representative at the OSCE criticized European officials for politicizing the problem and not cooperating with Belarus. In August, Lukashenko hinted at the possibility of sending not only illegal migrants but also radioactive materials for a "dirty bomb" through the border.

=== Incidents ===
- On 23 June, migrants rioted in a camp in Pabradė. Tear gas was used to suppress the protests.
- On 23 July, two children who illegally crossed the border with their families were hospitalized in Lithuania after Belarusian human traffickers gave them unknown pills to calm them down. According to the laboratory tests, the pills contained methadone.
- On 26 July, migrants demanded to leave the camp. 16 migrants were detained.

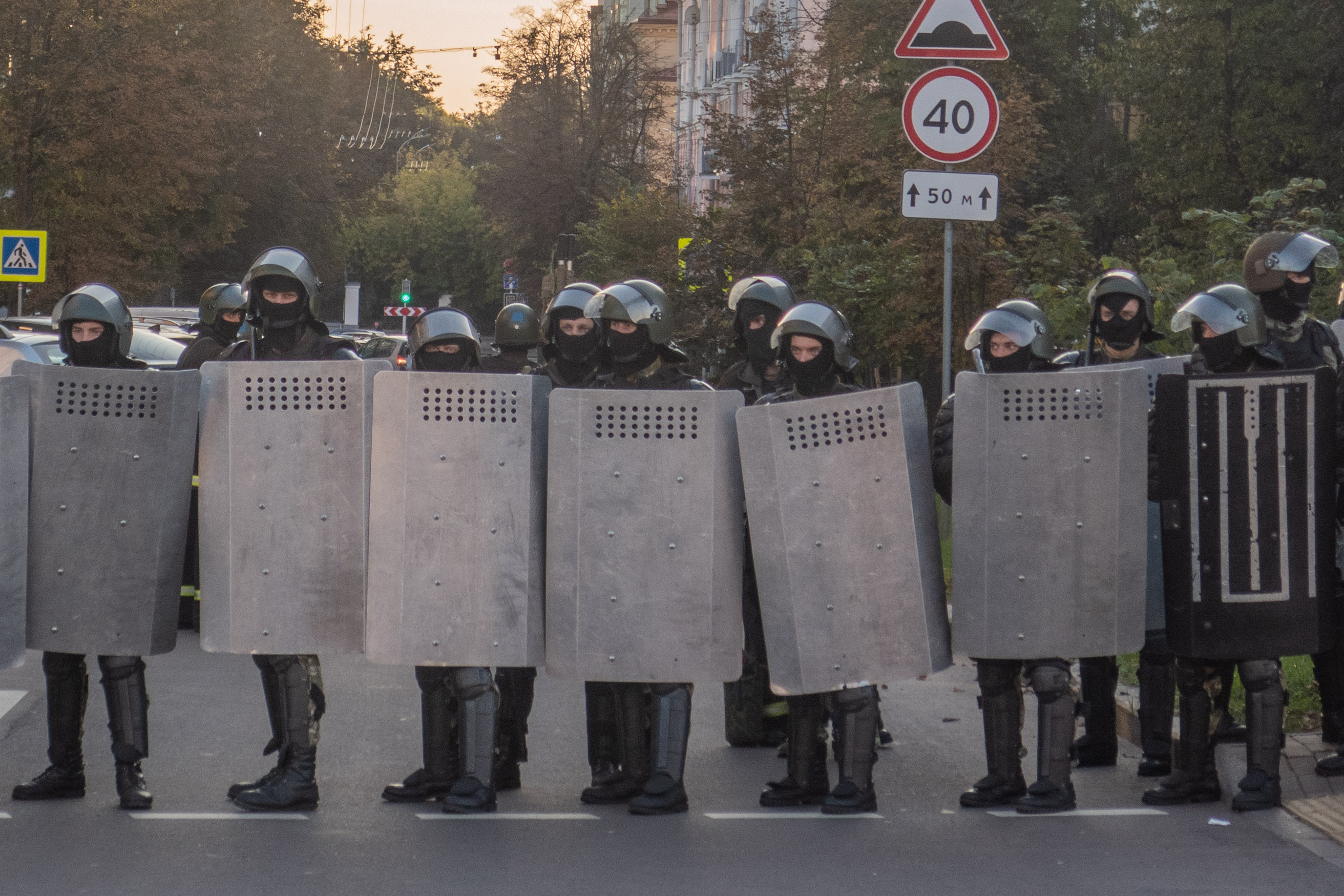
Uniform and equipment of Belarusian military men on a video published on 5 August resemble Internal Troops of Belarus (photo taken during 2020 protests in Minsk)

- On 5 August, Belarusian officials, wearing uniforms, riot shields and helmets, were recorded on camera near the Belarus–Lithuania border pushing and urging the migrants to cross the European Union border.
- On the night from 5 to 6 August, Lithuanian officials reported that they saw Belarusian officials using signal flares and heard shooting of live ammunition from assault rifles into the air from the Belarusian side.
- On 7 August, Iraq announced that it was stopping all flights from Iraq to Minsk, except for empty planes which would return Iraqis from Belarus.
- On 18 August, the Lithuanian State Border Guard Service published a video of 12 Belarusian officers in riot gear illegally crossed into the Lithuanian territory while pushing a group of migrants.
- On 7 October, Belarusian border guards reported a dead migrant from Sri Lanka found near the Lithuanian border.

=== Response ===
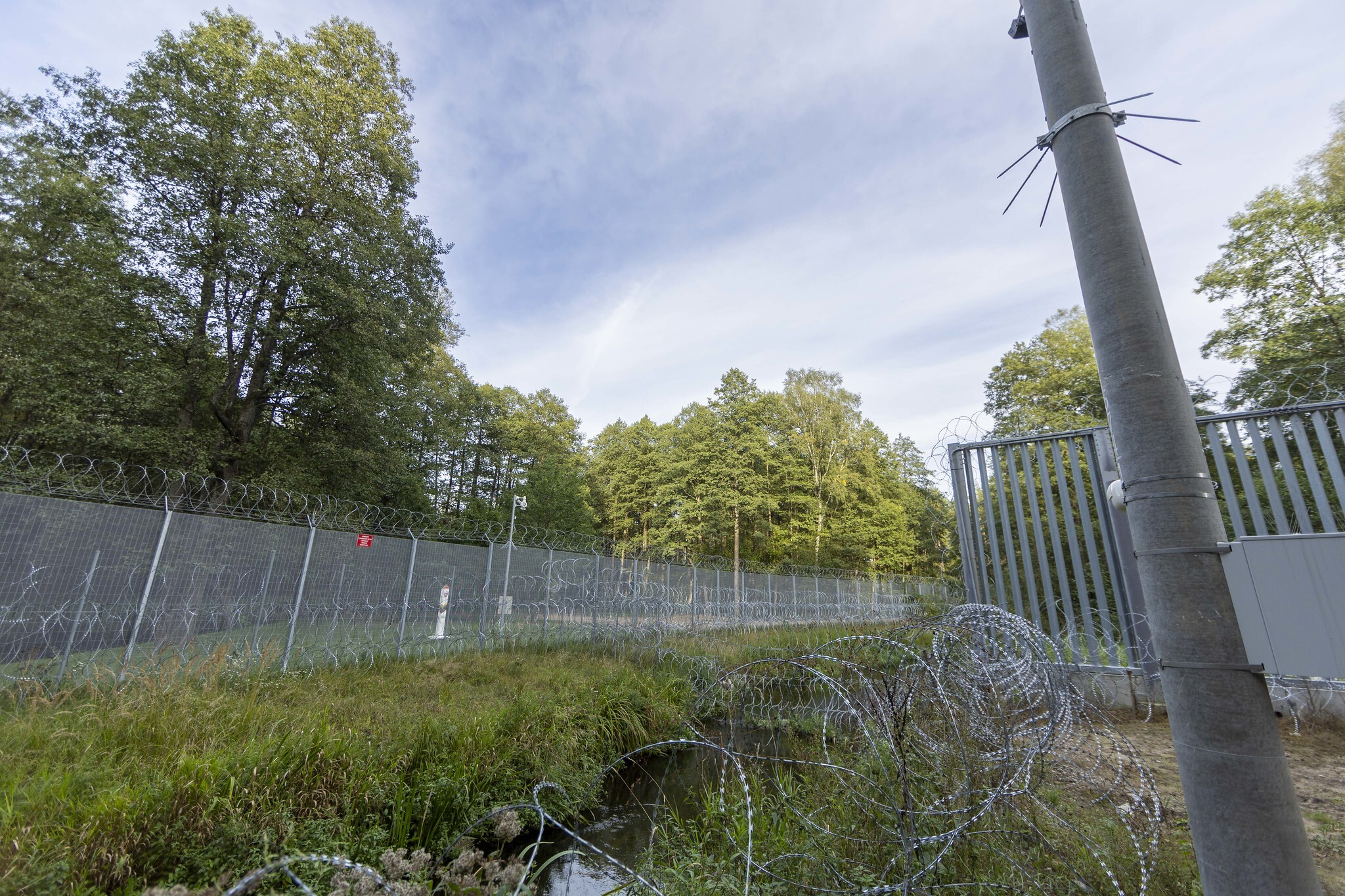
Border barrier built by Lithuania in 2022-2023

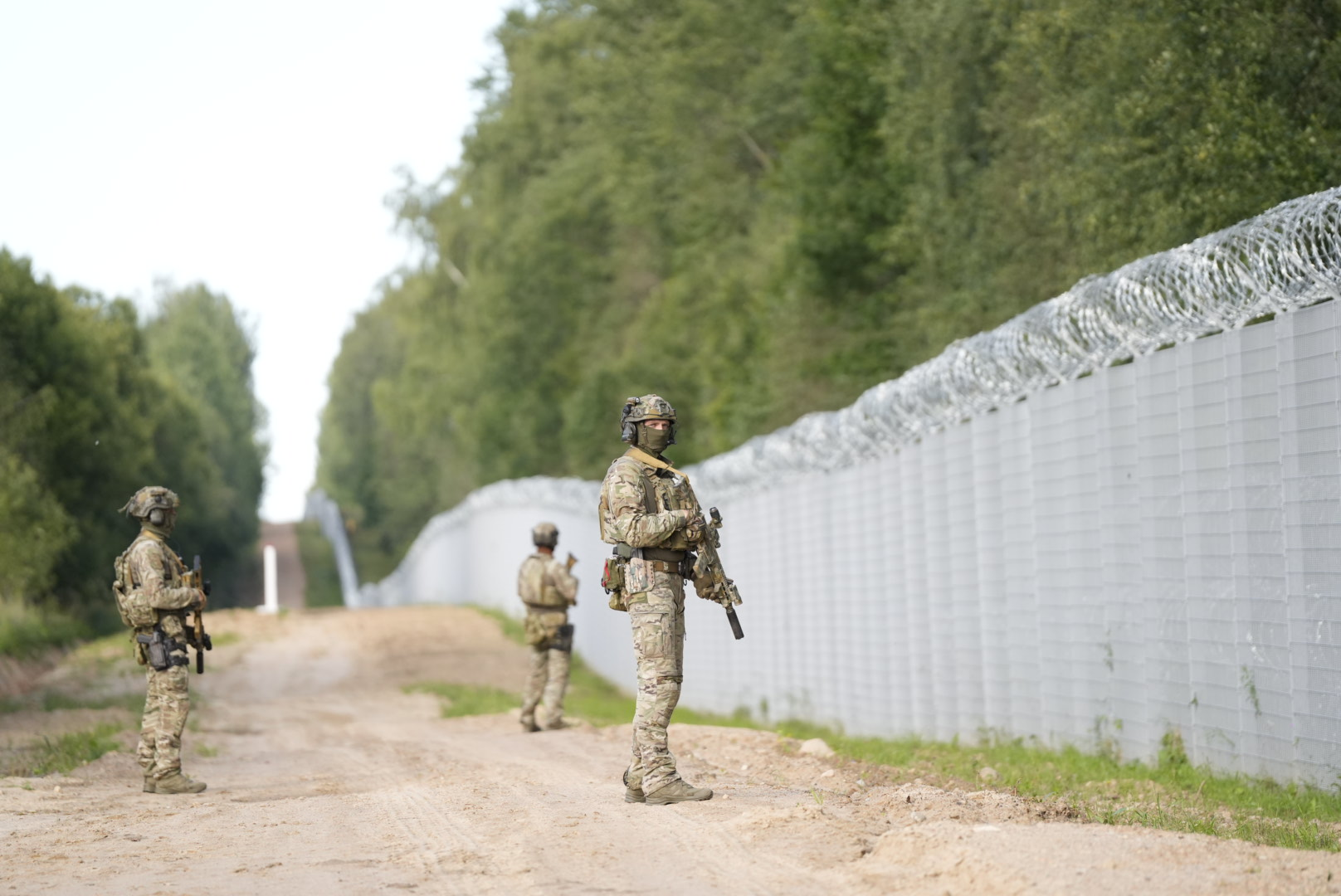
Latvian border barrier and patrols in 2023

Illegal migration from Belarus forced the Lithuanian government to declare a state-level "extraordinary situation" (similar but weaker legal regime than the state of emergency) on 2 July 2021. Lithuania had no experience in dealing with large numbers of illegal migrants and lacked places to accommodate them. Tent camps, which Lithuanian officials described as "not comfortable", were built to accommodate migrants. On 23 July, Lithuanian authorities published a plan to build a container camp near Švenčionėliai for 40,000 migrants in the worst-case scenario. Also that month, residents of Dieveniškės protested against proposed construction of a new camp in their region. On 26 or 27 July, locals tried to block a road to the area near Rūdninkai where a migrant camp was to be placed.

Also in July, the Lithuanian Seimas passed a law (signed by president Gitanas Nausėda on 21 July) making deportation of illegal migrants from Lithuania easier. The public opinion in Lithuania opposes illegal migration and xenophobic sentiment is reported to have spread.

Lithuanian Foreign Minister Gabrielius Landsbergis travelled to Baghdad in order to discuss the problem with the Iraqi authorities. During the trip, he requested the Iraqi government to halt the flights to Belarus. On a separate occasion in mid-July, Landsbergis stated that of those who crossed the border illegally, virtually none would be granted asylum and they would be detained in a tent camp until they could be sent home. By early August 2021, Lithuania had processed 230 asylum applications, all of which were later rejected.

In the meantime, in early July, Lithuania announced a plan to build a border barrier to stem the flow of illegal crossings. On 5 August 2021, the chief of the Lithuanian State Border Guard Service presented a project of the proposed barrier for the entire Belarus-Lithuania border which would be 4 m (13 ft) high and would use multiple layers of the Concertina wire. The cost of the project is estimated at €150 million and the Lithuanian parliament approved it as a matter of urgency. Other countries and institutions sent reinforcements to assist with the surge. On 24 July, Estonia sent 100 km of barbed wire to help Lithuania to build the border barrier and three drones for the Lithuanian border guards. Non-EU member Ukraine also sent more than 38 tonnes of barbed wire to Lithuania. Meanwhile, by the end of July, EU Frontex deployed 100 officers, 30 patrol cars and 2 helicopters to support Lithuania. Poland provided another helicopter.

By 7–8 August, the number of migrants crossing into the country dropped to almost zero after Lithuania sent reinforcements to the border area and began broadcasting warning messages in Arabic, Kurdish, French, Russian and English on loudspeakers.

As the number of migrants on the Polish borders surged, and some of them were active in damaging its infrastructure, on 9 November, the Parliament of Lithuania declared the state of emergency in the border regions for one month, prohibiting entry in the area within 5 km (3.1 mi) of the border without Lithuanian State Border Guard Service's approval and authorising the border guards to use "mental coercion" and proportionate physical force to contain the surge.

According to a poll conducted in August, 33% (the highest portion) of respondents in Lithuania answered that the best solution to the migration crisis would be to build a physical fence or a wall with Belarus. Other solutions in the answers included: pressure to Iraq, with the help of the EU, to stop the flights to Minsk (17%); requesting a transfer of some migrants to the other EU states (14%); and paying the migrants for their voluntary return (12%). Another 10% suggested negotiations with Lukashenko and only 3% suggested accepting the migrants with the strong integration programs in place. The remaining 11% did not answer or did not have an opinion.

By early 2023, Lithuania built the 530 km (330 mi) barrier and implemented 100% surveillance of the border. On 18 January 2023, the Lithuanian government renounced a previous agreement with Belarus. The agreement, which was signed in 2006, had established topics of cross-border partnership. Lithuania's Interior Ministry stated that the current situation made cooperation impossible.

In July 2026, a Lithuanian border guard received minor injuries after a group of migrants attacked and tried to forcibly take him over to Belarus.

== Poland ==
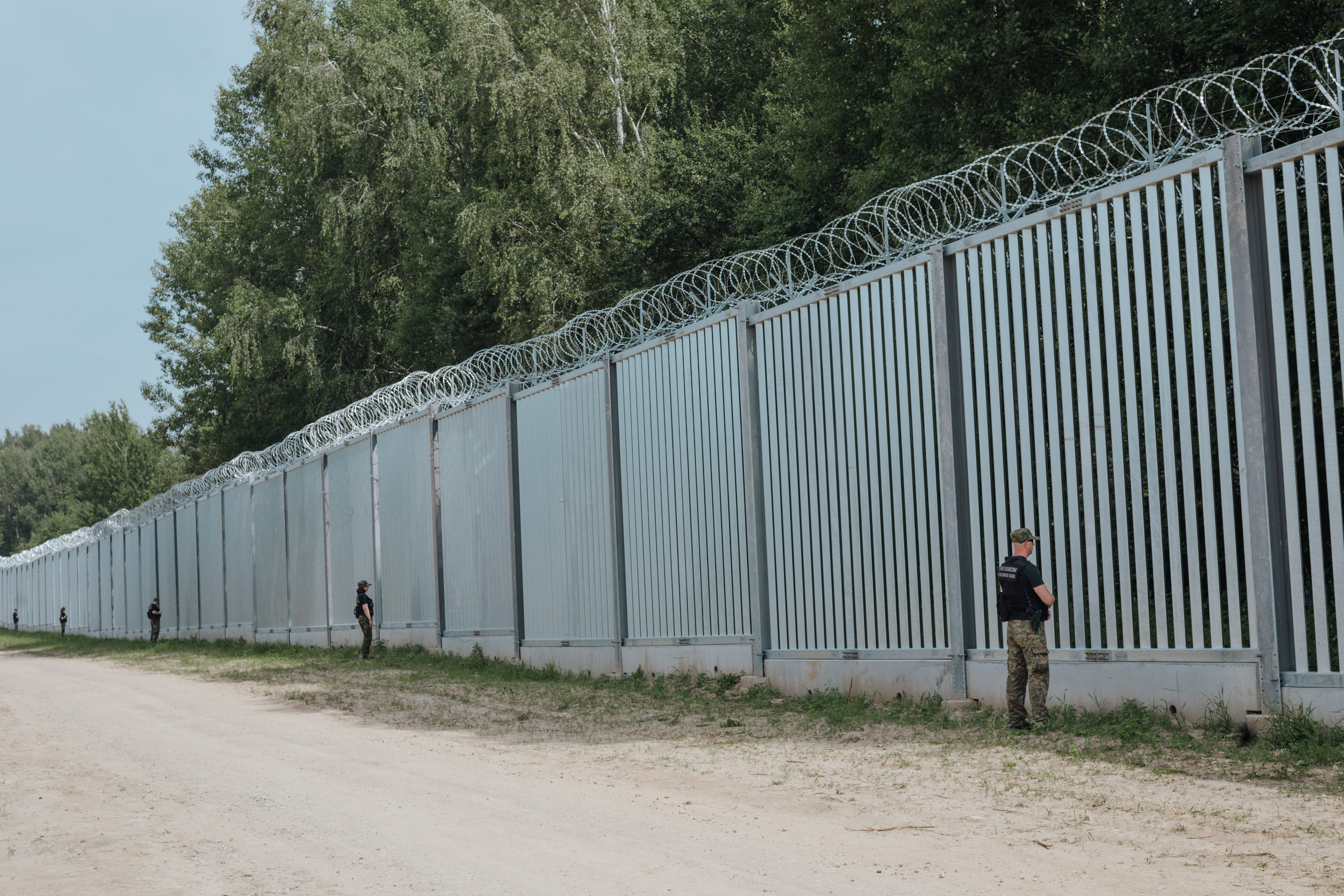
A border barrier constructed by Poland, 2022

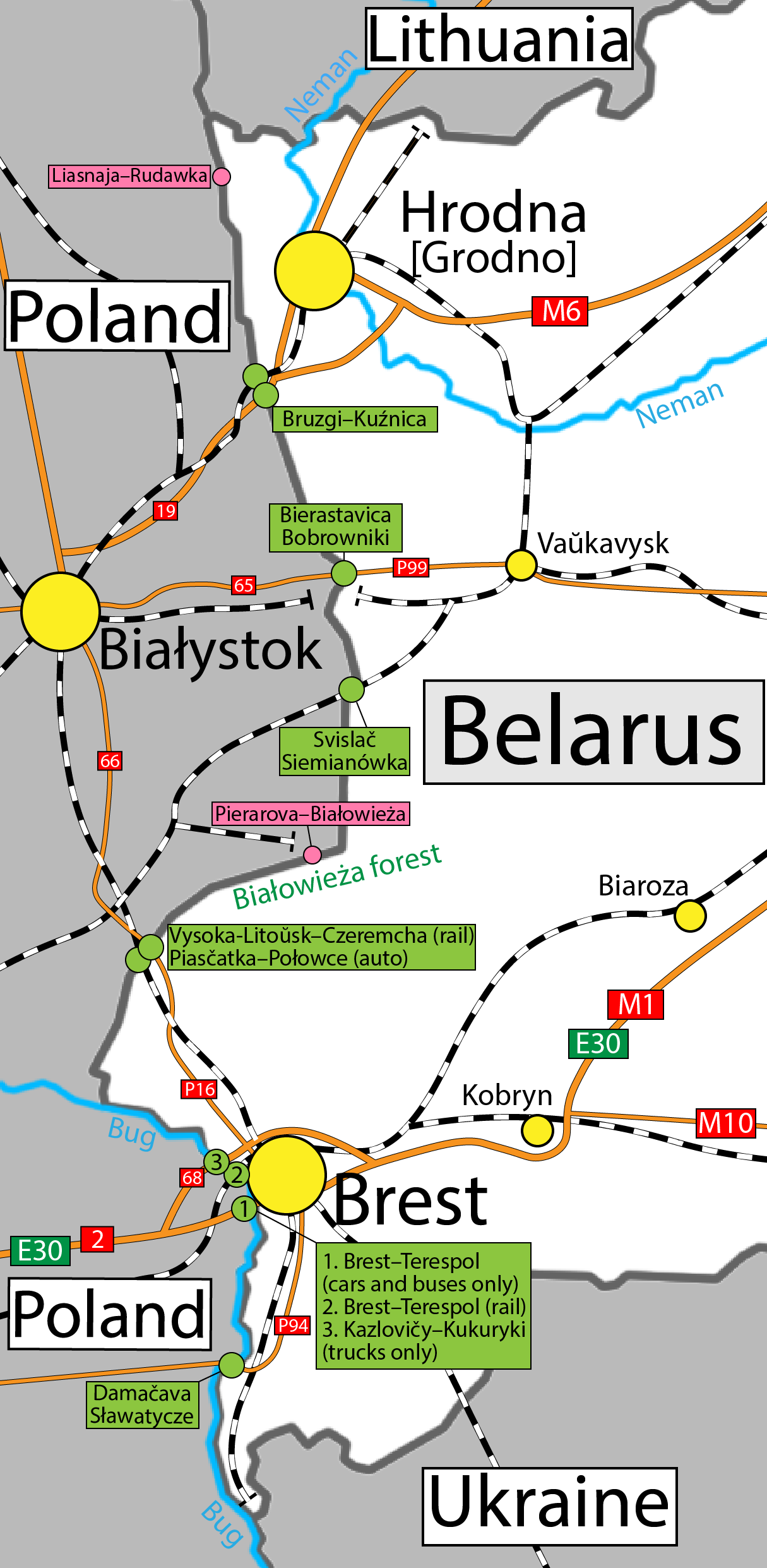
Map of the Belarus–Poland border. Border checkpoints Simplified border checkpoints

On 12 July 2021, President of Poland Andrzej Duda stated that Poland would provide assistance to Lithuania, which it sent later that month. Following the granting of humanitarian visas to an Olympic athlete Krystsina Tsimanouskaya and her husband, Poland also accused Belarus of organizing hybrid warfare as the number of migrants crossing the Belarus–Poland border sharply increased when compared to the 2020 statistics. On 6 August, Poland reported 133 illegal crossings from Belarus over two days, which is more than the total number in the previous year, with the total number of illegal crossings up to that date being 552. On 9 August, Poland reported an additional 349 migrant arrivals over the weekend. The number of intercepted attempts increased significantly in the autumn. In September 2021, Polish authorities estimated the number of migrants waiting to sneak from Belarus to the EU at 10,000. In total, there were more than 32,000 intercepted attempts of immigrants to cross the Polish border as of 11 November 2021, of which 3,500 attempts were made in August, almost 7,700 in September and almost 17,300 in October. In November 2021, the Polish government estimated that 3,000–4,000 migrants were waiting in the vicinity of the border.

In early August, a group of 32 Afghans and 41 Iraqi Kurds appeared on the border in the aftermath of the fall of Kabul and were denied entry to either country, resulting in lines of military personnel on each side isolating the encamped migrants. Their appearance follows an influx of thousands of mostly Western Asian migrants that had crossed the border from Belarus into Poland and other eastern EU members Latvia and Lithuania in the months leading up to the fall of Kabul, with the EU claiming that Belarus purposefully engineered the migration in response to union sanctions. While the Belarusian government denied this accusation, Poland called it a "hybrid attack" on the bloc and said the migrants should not be allowed entry because they are technically still in Belarus. After the migrants sought asylum assistance, the European Court of Human Rights (ECHR) summoned Poland and Latvia to provide them "food, water, clothing, adequate medical care and, if possible, temporary shelter" for three weeks, according to a statement from the court on 25 August, although neither country was ordered to allow the migrants past the border.

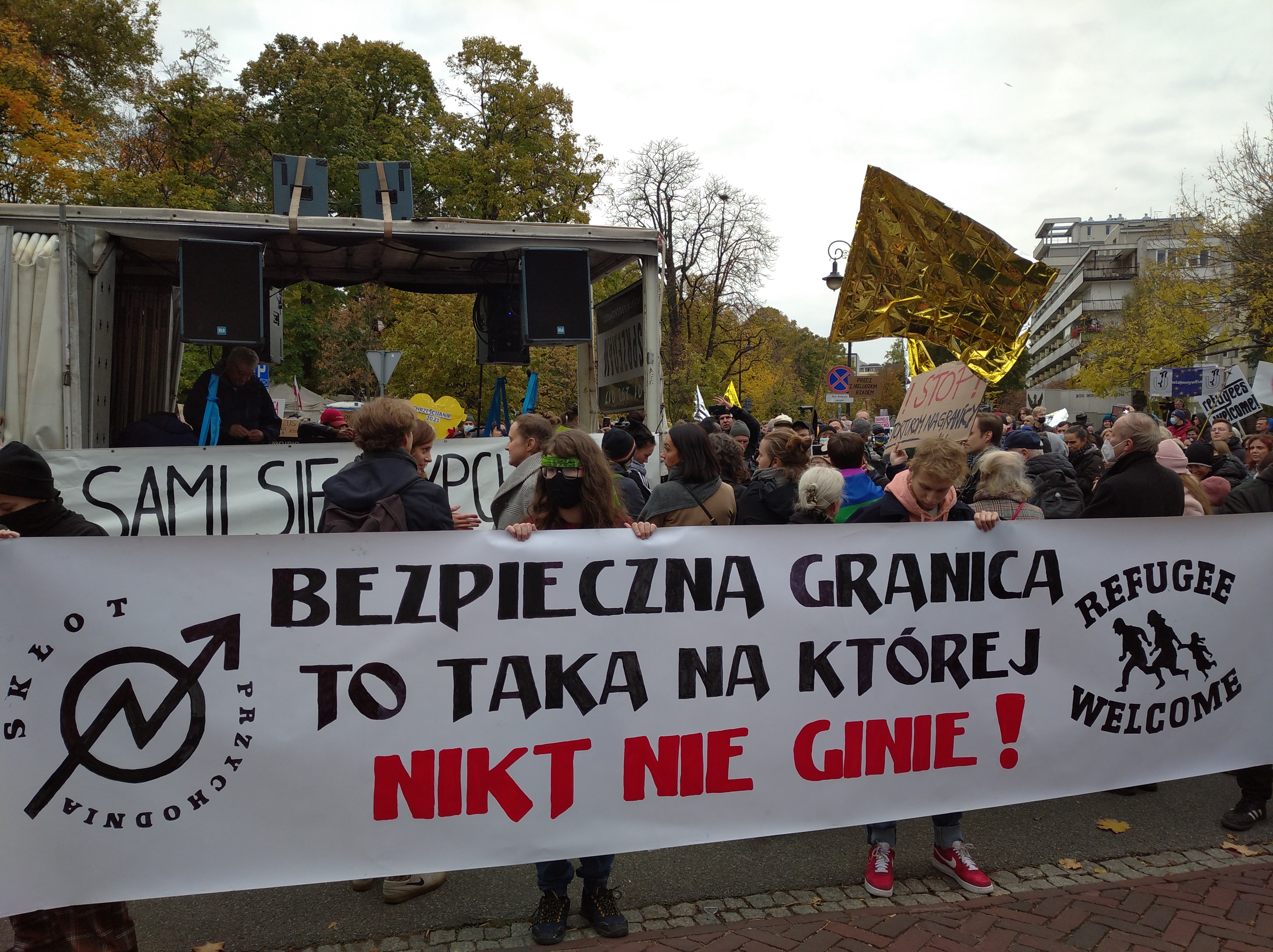
People in Warsaw take part in a protest rally on 17 October in solidarity with migrants who have been pushed back at Poland's border with Belarus. The sign reads "A safe border is one where no one dies!"

Since 18 August 2021, the Polish Armed Forces were sent to secure the border with Belarus. As the number of attempted crossings increased, on 2 September, Poland announced a state of emergency in the areas close to the border, limiting the freedom of movement, freedom of assembly, and, controversially, ordering human rights activists and doctors unaffiliated with the Border Guard to go and effectively forbidding journalists from reporting from the area, which Urszula Glensk described as an "informational blockade" instituted by Polish Prime Minister Mateusz Morawiecki. The majority of Polish outlets signed a letter demanding that journalists be allowed to enter the restricted zone. Because the Sejm already extended the state of emergency for another 60 days and since Article 230 of the Constitution of Poland prohibits to extend it further, the government announced that it would let the journalists in, while attempting to maintain most of the regulations barring people from entering the zone.

Just like Lithuania, Poland announced its intention to build a border wall with Belarus. On 25 October, Mariusz Błaszczak, the defence minister, announced the construction of a permanent border wall on Poland's 400 km border with Belarus at a cost of about 350 million euros. It also announced beefing up the security personnel at the border, which numbered 7,500 as of October 2021 and has steadily risen to 15,000 by mid-November, and using military helicopters to patrol the border.

In general, Poles are somewhat approving the government's actions on the border. In August 2021, a poll showed that 45 percent of the Polish public positively assess the government's handling of a migrant standoff on the Belarus-Poland border while 29 percent were critical of it and 26 percent had no opinion. A survey in October found fewer people undecided about the issue of migration, with 54 percent supportive of the government policies and 36 percent opposed, while the one in November saw many more people undecided – a quarter of respondents did not have an opinion on the topic, and the support dropped to 39 percent, with the same proportion of disapproving opinions as the previous month. Moreover, in November 2021, a poll appeared that suggested that some 54.5% of those surveyed were in favour of the policy of pushbacks.

In October 2021, the head of the ruling Law and Justice party (PiS) and Poland's deputy Prime Minister Jarosław Kaczyński accused the Polish opposition parties of supporting Lukashenko's actions. In November 2021, Poland's state-controlled news channel, TVP Info, accused the Polish opposition of "supporting migrants and Lukashenko."

On 8 November, former Polish prime minister Donald Tusk called for Poland to invoke Article 4 of the North Atlantic Treaty, which would convene a meeting of NATO members to discuss the crisis.

On 15 November, the National Bank of Poland announced that it will issue commemorative coins and banknotes dedicated to the defense of the eastern border.

On 18 November, Polish authorities announced that Belarus should stop provocations on the border threatening to close the railroad border checkpoint Kuźnica—Bruzgi otherwise.

=== Timeline of border incidents ===
==== 2021 ====
Migrants who wanted to illegally cross the EU border into Poland used violence on several occasions, according to videos published by Polish Border Guard.

On 9 September 2021, the Polish Border Guard published a video of Belarusian military vehicles transporting migrants and instructing them on the Belarusian side of the border.

On 8 October, Polish authorities published a video with Belarusian border guards assisting the migrants cross the border. On the same day, the Polish military reported shooting (presumably with blank cartridges) occurring from the Belarusian side.

On 25 October, Polish media reported about a clash between the Polish soldiers and about 60–70 migrants near the village of Usnarz Górny. Two Polish soldiers were injured by branches and stones, and unidentified people attempted to break a razor wire on the border.

On the night between 1 and 2 November, some unidentified uniformed men entered a few hundred meters into the Polish territory and subsequently fled back to Belarus, which made the Polish ministry of foreign affairs to summon the Belarusian chargé d'affaires.

Major attempt to break through the border on 8 November 2021 and its aftermath
- Migrants' camp on Belarusian side of border
- Migrants' camp on Belarusian side of border
- Migrants attacking border fences with logs
- Polish border guards
- Destroyed Polish border fence with plates
- Belarusian military made a chain preventing migrants to go to the legal border crossing and road
- A migrant cuts tree in Belarus
- A crowd of migrants on 8 November
- Belarusian military behind the migrants' camp

On 8 November, a big crowd of several hundred illegal migrants, escorted by the Belarusian military (presumably Belarusian siloviki), tried to break through the Belarus–Poland border near Bruzgi, Grodno Region. The Polish border guards were expecting the column to arrive since the weekend preceding the attempted breakthrough, while the first reports about the big column of migrants heading to the Bruzgi-Kuźnica border crossing appeared in the morning that day. According to reform.by, the majority of migrants in this group were Iraqi Kurds, who organized and gathered via social media. Belarusian authorities did not allow migrants to go to the neutral zone via the border crossing, but forwarded them to the neutral zone through the nearby forest. Both sides published videos showing attempts to cut the barbed wire with wire cutters and scissors, provided by the Belarusian military, or to destroy it with logs. The migrants threw stones at Polish border guards, who used tear gas in response. Some 21,000 soldiers, border guards and policemen were concentrated in the area. According to The Guardian and Associated Press, the standoff was an attempt to increase pressure on Poland and the European Union by Lukashenko. The atmosphere calmed down the following day.

Due to the standoff, the Polish government closed the border crossing at Kuźnica, to the north-east of Białystok. As the traffic was directed to other border crossings, they saw immense queues, with Rzeczpospolita reporting a 26-kilometre-long (16 mi) traffic jam full of lorries towards Bobrowniki checkpoint, which it estimated could be passed in 67 hours. The Polish government considered the closure of the whole border with Belarus. The situation on the border also prompted Estonia, France and Ireland to convene a meeting of the UN Security Council to discuss the matter on 11 November, and some human rights organisations, including the Helsinki Committee for Human Rights, to sue Belarus in the International Criminal Court, alleging crimes against humanity (Belarus is not party to the ICC). Belarus, in its turn, dismisses the allegations as a ploy to detract the inhabitants of the European Union from its own problems. Local representatives of the United Nations High Commissioner for Refugees and International Organization for Migration who visited the camp near Bruzgi offered the migrants to voluntarily return home or to apply for refugee status in Belarus.

Belarus's leader raised the possibility of interrupting the Yamal–Europe pipeline carrying Russian gas to the European Union if the bloc imposes further sanctions on Belarus. However, Russian President Vladimir Putin, whose consent was needed before closing the pipe, said that Lukashenko had not consulted him before raising the possibility of stopping gas deliveries coming from Russia to the EU via a pipeline through Belarus, adding that such a move would risk harming relations between the two countries.

On 9 November, a Polish journalist Tadeusz Giczan published a recording made by an immigrant showing Belarusian soldiers shooting with assault rifles near immigrants sitting on the ground.

On 12 November, the Polish Border Guard reported that the Belarusian side was destroying the border fence near Czeremcha and used green lasers and strobe lights in an apparent attempt to blind the patrolling officers, which claim the Belarusians denied. The usage of lasers as blinding weapons is generally prohibited by the United Nations Protocol on Blinding Laser Weapons.

On 13 November, a recording appeared on a Russian-language Telegram channel showing Belarusian soldiers handing out bread to immigrants, shooting near them to force them to get in line.

On 16 November 2021, the migrants undertook another major attempt to break through the border forcefully. They started to throw rocks, bottles and pieces of wood at the Polish border guards and tried to destroy the border fence in attempt to break through the border at the temporarily closed checkpoint of Bruzgi-Kuźnica. Polish border guards used water cannons, stun grenades and tear gas on the migrants. Polish authorities accused the Belarusian military of supplying the migrants and giving them stun grenades. One Polish officer was wounded in the head. Altogether, Poland registered 161 attempts of illegal border crossing into its territory on 16 November.

==== 2022 ====
On 26 October 2022, near the village of Łosiniany, the body of a Sudanese man who drowned in a river was found. In December 2022, the activist group Podlaskie Ochotnicze Pogotowie Humanitarne received tens of requests of help from refugees on the border per week.

==== 2023 ====
On 7 January, Yemeni doctor Ibrahem Jaber Ahmed Dehya died from exposure in Białowieża Forest. According to border guards, Ibrahem was one of a group of Yemenis who had crossed the border, crossing the river Przewłoka, a tributary of Leśna river. The border guards detained three of the group who requested help while Ibrahim was ill but still alive. According to Ibrahem's colleagues, the border guards initially refused to search for Ibrahem, instead expulsing the three to Belarus. Other colleagues of Ibrahem searched again for help and found a second patrol, which searched for Ibrahim and found him dead. The activist group Grupa Granica accused the border guards of having pushed back Ibrahem's colleagues to Belarus. Ibrahem was buried two days later in Bohoniki.

On 4 February 2023, an Ethiopian woman fell ill near Hajnówka. Two men who sought help for her from police and border guards were deported to Belarus and found in ill health on the Belarusian side of the border several days later. The woman was found dead on 12 February on Polish territory. Grupa Granica called for prosecution of those responsible for her death, accusing the authorities of not fulfilling legal obligations of the right of asylum. On 15 October 2023, the nationwide referendum included questions regarding, among others, the acceptance of illegal immigrants and the dismantling of the barrier on the Polish-Belarusian border.

On 23 October 2023, the body of a foreigner was found by the tracks in the village of Dobrowoda. Another foreigner died in the presence of a Polish patrol. On 4 November, the body of a Syrian was found. The next day, the illegal immigrant was shot by a Polish soldier.

==== 2024 ====
In February 2024, a human skull of a person from the Middle East was found on the Stara Białowieża – Narewka road. On 14 March 2024, the body of a 32-year-old man from Pakistan was found in a forest near the town of Sorocza Nóżka.

In the morning of 28 May, a migrant outside the border barrier stabbed a Polish soldier by the name of Mateusz Sitek, with a knife on a stick near the town of Dubicze Cerkiewne, Podlaskie Voivodeship. The seriously injured soldier was evacuated by a military ambulance and taken to hospital. The next day the Ministry of Interior and Administration decided to send additional forces to the border and recreate a 200-meter exclusion zone along the entire border with Belarus. The wounded soldier died in hospital 9 days later. The Polish foreign ministry demanded that Belarus identify the assailant and hand them over to Polish officials on 6 June. Belarus's border service stated that it would start an investigation to the incident if Poland gave them "concrete information" about the stabbing.

In the following days, attacks by large groups of immigrants intensified. On 4 June, in another attack near Białowieża, Podlaskie Voivodeship, a Polish Border Guard officer was injured in the head and was taken to hospital. 2 border guards were also slightly injured.

On 10 June, it was reported that the Belarusian Border Guard had found the body of a Belarusian soldier with the rank of sergeant on the Augustów Canal, and it was reported that he had probably taken his own life.

In October 2024, Donald Tusk said: "Every day we’re seeing 100, 150, even 200 attempts to cross the border illegally."

On 28 November 2024, the body of a young Eritrean was found near the town of Lipszczany, the cause was hypothermia.

==== 2025 ====
In March 2025, Poland suspended the right to apply for asylum at the Belarus-Poland border, with the European Commission supporting Poland's move.

In April 2025, after meeting with Pakistani Prime Minister Shehbaz Sharif in Minsk, Alexander Lukashenko announced a plan to open Belarus to 150,000 migrant workers from Pakistan. Lukashenko's migration plans have raised concerns in neighboring Poland. In December 2025, a hidden border tunnel was found through which over 180 illegal migrants crossed from Belarus to Poland. This was the fourth such tunnel discovered in 2025, representing a new front in Belarusian hybrid warfare tactics to smuggle migrants to the European Union.

== Latvia ==
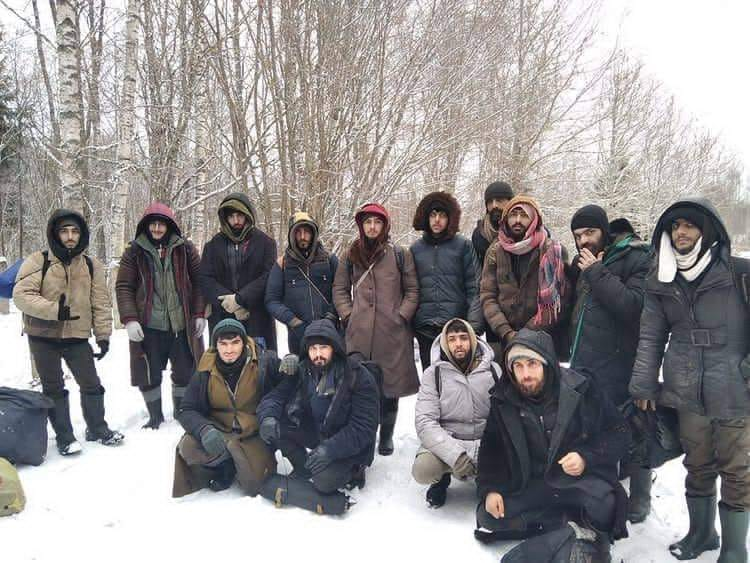
A group of migrants on the Latvia–Belarus border in February 2022

On 4 August 2021, it was reported that the situation on the Latvia–Belarus border was still relatively peaceful with only four registered incidents of illegal border crossing and a total of 27 third-country nationals detained in the whole 2021. However, that soon changed and already by 8 August 101 additional third-country nationals had been detained for illegally crossing the Latvia–Belarus border.

On 13 August, Latvian Armed Forces (LAF) published a video showing three cases of armed Belarusian border guards trying to expel migrants to Latvia, and not allowing them return to Belarus. The video has not been interdependently proofed. Similar reports about Belarusian border guards pushing out migrants from Belarus to Latvia appeared later.

The Cabinet of Ministers of Latvia declared a state of emergency from 11 August until 10 November in the border municipalities of Ludza, Krāslava, and Augšdaugava, and also in Daugavpils city. The government prohibited the submission of applications for refugee status in these border regions, and all migrants captured there had to return to Belarus. President of Latvia Egils Levits said that under international law, refugees should apply for asylum in the first safe country they arrive after leaving their own countries, in this case – Belarus. On 12 November, the Latvian Saeima approved the construction of a border wall on the stretch with Belarus.

Latvian border guards reported having turned back over 6,500 people attempting to cross the border from Belarus since the introduction of the state of emergency in August 2021 up to March 2022. The findings of the researchers, however, suggest that what lies behind these figures are largely the same people who were/are subjected to daily pushbacks. This has been officially confirmed by a representative of the State Border Guard who stated in an interview that those apprehended at the border every day are largely the same individuals.

According to an independent estimate, the total number of individuals who have attempted to illegally cross the Latvian border since August 2021 could be as low as 250. The same study, based on remote interviews with approximately 30 of the migrants, has also alleged extreme violence and even torture against them at the hands of the Latvian "commandos", police and soldiers. Minister of the Interior of Latvia Marija Golubeva categorically denied the accusations, as did the Ministry of Defense. The State Border Guard called the accusations "blatant defamation" and pointed out that not a single case of the use or even complaints about the use of "physical force and/or special means" by a member of the State Border Guard, the National Armed Forces or the State Police against an illegal border crosser has been recorded, nor has the Emergency Medical Service any information about the injuries that could have been caused by such actions of the aforementioned institutions.

== Other responses ==
=== EU ===
The EU condemned the use of migrants as weapons, threatened to impose further sanctions on Belarus, and pressed Iraq to suspend migrant flights between Iraq and Belarus. Iraq had previously promised to establish a joint commission with the EU to address the issue. The EU initially refused a request by the Lithuanian government to help finance a border wall, noting its longstanding policy of not providing money for border barriers. In November, however, a proposal was circulated proposing some EU funding for "border infrastructure", provided the recipient countries permit the EU's own border agency Frontex to help manage the borders, which Poland has to date refused to do. Joanna Hosa of the European Council on Foreign Relations noted that "Poland has an ongoing battle with Brussels over the rule of law situation, and so Poland is trying to show that it can manage the problem alone. Asking the EU for help would not necessarily be an easy thing for the Polish government to do."

The EU and Archbishop Wojciech Polak, the head of Catholic Church in Poland, called for humanitarian organizations such as Médecins Sans Frontières to gain access to the borders to help migrants.

=== Other government actors ===
- NATO: The North Atlantic Treaty Organization condemned "the continued instrumentalisation of irregular migration artificially created by Belarus as part of hybrid actions targeted against Poland, Lithuania, and Latvia for political purposes."
- Germany: Germany, one of the primary end destinations of many of the migrants, registered 2,000 asylum seekers who had passed through Belarus, compared to 26 during the first half of 2021. In October 2021, German foreign minister Heiko Maas said that the airlines that carry migrants to Belarus "make themselves into helpers of the rulers in Minsk." The municipal government of Munich declared its readiness to accept migrants. In November 2021, German chancellor Angela Merkel made a phone call to Lukashenko on this issue but Lukashenko's spokesperson Natallia Eismant and the German authorities voiced completely different versions about its content.
- Estonia: In July 2021, Estonia condemned the human trafficking organized by Belarusian authorities and sent its border patrols and tents to boost the protection of the Belarus–Lithuania border. On 6 August 2021, Estonia announced that it would raise the question of migrant crisis at the United Nations Security Council. On 17 November 2021, the Estonian government called almost 1,700 reserve soldiers to hold a snap defence readiness exercise; the reserve engineers will construct temporary fences in Estonia's border areas with Russia
- Ukraine: On 11 November 2021, Ukraine announced that they would deploy 8,500 soldiers and police officers, as well as 15 helicopters, to the border with Belarus to prevent possible attempts by stranded migrants to cross into the country in order to reach the European Union.
- United Kingdom: In November 2021, the United Kingdom sent a contingent of troops (10 soldiers) from the Royal Engineers to support Poland's border security. This number was increased to 150 later that same month. On 9 December 2021, the United Kingdom's Ministry of Defence announced it would send 140 military engineers to provide Poland with support at its border with Belarus.
- Iraq: On 7 August 2021, Iraq stopped all direct flights to Belarus. Three months later, the government of Iraq closed two honorary consulates of Belarus in Baghdad and Erbil in an attempt to suppress the schemes of illegal migration via Belarus. On 18 November, Iraq organized a rescue flight from Minsk which took away 430 migrants who agreed to come back home. The second rescue flight was scheduled on 19 November, but it was cancelled for unknown reason.
- Turkey: In November 2021, Turkey restricted certain nationalities from buying tickets for flights to Belarus, potentially closing off one of the main routes that the EU says Belarus has used to fly in migrants by the thousand to engineer a humanitarian crisis on its frontier. EU officials welcomed this decision. Turkey also dismissed Polish allegations about aiding the migrant flow to its border.

==== Estonia ====
Estonia, which shares a border with the Russian Federation, has been mobilizing its troops to protect its Southeastern and Northeastern border and constructing border barriers from barbed wire. 17th Engineer Battalion is moving from its place of dislocation (Tapa) towards the Southeastern border. From 19 to 26 November, all flights around the Russian border are forbidden due to the construction of barriers for "hybrid attacks". In November, Estonia announced that they will send 100 troops from engineering, military police and reconnaissance units to Poland.

=== Attempts to prevent flights ===
Despite Iraq stopping all direct flights to Belarus, the number of arrivals did not reduce as many people instead began using indirect routes via Dubai, Turkey, Lebanon or Ukraine. There were calls for Ireland, where many companies leasing airplanes are located, to revoke their leases to Belavia, the airline carrying most of the migrants to Belarus. Simon Coveney, the Irish Minister for Foreign Affairs, said forcing airlines to break these contracts would be difficult and instead called for further sanctions.

Belavia itself originally did not intend to restrict the flow of passengers from the Middle East to Belarus, saying that because it is not a border agency and they cannot distinguish migrants from other passengers, it may not decline services to its customers. Belarus's director of the aviation department of the ministry of transportation, Artem Sikorsky, additionally said that they were forced to fly to Istanbul because they had been shut out of the European Union in May due to the grounding of the plane carrying Roman Protasevich. However, on 12 November 2021, Belavia was legally required by Turkey to deny boarding on any flights to Belarus to the citizens of Iraq, Syria and Yemen. Two days later, Belavia announced that it would deny boarding to the citizens of said countries as well as Afghan nationals on flights from Dubai. Measures to prevent potential migrants from boarding on flights to Belarus were taken by the authorities of Lebanon, UAE and Uzbekistan.

== Human rights issues ==
The legal status of migrants became more vulnerable after Belarus unilaterally withdrew from the readmission agreement with the EU, and up to 40% of migrants in Lithuanian camps belong to vulnerable groups. EU leaders have supported the Lithuanian government in its efforts.

On 4 August 2021, Belarusian border guards claimed that they found an Iraqi man in serious condition in Benyakoni, near the border with Lithuania. The unidentified man allegedly "died in the arms of the [Lithuanian] border guards". Belarusian dictator Alexander Lukashenko ordered an investigation into his death. The Lithuanian Interior Ministry dismissed the Belarusian reports that the Iraqi migrant had been found beaten to death after being turned away at the Lithuanian border, describing it as part of a hybrid war and disinformation being waged by Belarus.

Human rights activists accused Polish authorities of denying adequate medical care, food and shelter to stranded migrants, which prompted the intervention of the European Court of Human Rights. On 25 August 2021, the court ordered Poland and Latvia to provide the migrants food, water, clothing, adequate medical care and temporary shelter, should the countries have such possibility. Belarusian authorities refused to accept the Polish humanitarian aid intended for migrants who got stuck on the Belarusian-Polish border at least twice, in August and October.

A migrant from Yemen complained to reporters that Belarusian border guards beat up his companion and broke his leg. A group of Yazidis from Iraq made a similar complaint. They also reported food shortages and said they were cold, and some of them sick. Another migrant was reported to be thrown into a river by a Belarusian border guard. Belarusian border guards were also accused of robbing the migrants of their money, phones, documents and other things from their bags. One of the migrants claimed that he was forced by Belarusian border guards to pay US$100 to charge the phone. A Syrian migrant who managed to sneak into Poland but got caught there claimed that the Belarusian military threatened him not to return to Belarus, reportedly claiming that "if you come back, we will kill you". In November 2021, after Iraq launched rescue flights for its citizens, migrants on the Belarusian side of the border reported problems that hindered their return, such as an impossibility to leave the border zone among other problems.

In August Lithuania and in October Poland legalized pushback of migrants by force, which is illegal under EU and international law. Human rights group Amnesty International and other human rights organisations said that Poland and Lithuania breached migrants' rights, as they limit the access of asylum seekers to their territory. Eve Geddie, director of Amnesty International's European Institutions Office, stated that "Forcing people back who are trying to claim asylum without an individual assessment of their protection needs is against European and international law." Poland and Lithuania violated international laws including the prohibition on collective expulsions stipulated in the European Convention on Human Rights. Some of the migrants additionally claim that they were forcefully deported to their country of origin, as in the case of a family from Slemani, Iraqi Kurdistan, who reported to Rudaw that after they crossed the border into Poland, they were caught and told they would be transferred to a camp near Warsaw, but they were taken to the airport with some other migrants and flown to Erbil instead.

On 24 November 2021, Human Rights Watch published a report "Die Here or Go to Poland: Belarus' and Poland's Shared Responsibility for Border Abuses" claiming "serious abuses on both sides of the border". HRW accused Belarusian border guards of violence, inhuman and degrading treatment and coercion, and Polish border guards — of pushing the migrants back to Belarus despite pleading for asylum. HRW accused Belarusian authorities of manufacturing the situation which resulted in at least 13 deaths, and suggested that some severe cases of inhumane treatment can be seen as a torture.

The groups "Grupa Granica" and "Fundacja Ocalenie" have emerged in Poland as activists providing humanitarian aid for migrants on the ground, as well as "Sienos Grupė" in Lithuania. Famous human right activists such as Anna Alboth, Nawal Soufi, Serge Kollwelter and others have been joining the cause of helping migrants and refugees. Organizations and activists have been facing state ordered crack-downs and criminalization of their actions in both Poland and Lithuania.

== Comparisons ==
The events were compared by some commentators and human rights activists to the migrant crisis at the Greece–Turkey border and Turkish President Erdoğan's repeated threat to Europe to expect millions of migrants if Turkey were to open its borders.

European Union foreign affairs chief Josep Borrell compared the situation on the Belarus–Poland border to the migrant crisis on the Morocco–Spain border. Lithuanian prime minister Ingrida Šimonytė has also used the Morocco–Spain example and specifically a case of N.D. and N.T. v Spain as a precedent for the Lithuanian state forces' response to the crisis.

Poland's Defence Minister Mariusz Blaszczak said the border barrier marking the frontier with Belarus would resemble the one built by Hungarian Prime Minister Viktor Orbán on Hungary's border with Serbia during a migrant crisis in 2015. Poland's Interior Minister Mariusz Kamiński said that the new razor-wire border fence armed with heat sensors and cameras will be similar to that on the Greece–Turkey border, with inspiration also drawn from the Hungarian border barrier.

== Smuggling of cigarettes and drugs ==
Belarus is one of the largest sources of illegal cigarettes in the European Union: in 2017, the European Commissioner for Budget and Administration Günther Oettinger estimated that nearly 10% of illicit cigarettes in the EU originated from Belarus. It is alleged that the smuggling of the Belarusian-produced cigarettes is facilitated by various businessmen, such as Aliaksei Aleksin, who are close to Alexander Lukashenko. This contraband is thought to be an important revenue source for the Lukashenko regime. During the early weeks of the migrant crisis, Belarusian border guards told journalists that they got orders to encourage not only illegal migration, but also cigarette smuggling. In May 2021, Polish customs found the largest cigarette shipment ever in a rail container estimated at US$10 million (~$11.7 million in 2025).

Among the threats to the European Union voiced by Alexander Lukashenko in May 2021, drugs were mentioned. (Note: Quote: "We stopped drugs and migrants. Now you will eat them and catch them yourselves.") A former employee of the presidential administration, Anatoly Kotov, suggested that Belarusian authorities could organize a "drug problem" for the EU after the migration crisis ends.

== See also ==
- Weaponized migration
- European migrant crisis
- Immigration to Europe
- Finland–Russia border#November 2023 border closures
- Migration and asylum policy of the European Union
- Belarus–European Union relations
- Belarus–Latvia relations
- Belarus–Lithuania relations
- Belarus–Poland relations
- Migration diplomacy
- Swarming (military)
