= Refugees in Poland =

Refugees in Poland were, until 2022, a relatively small group. Since 1989, the number of people applying for refugee status in Poland has risen from about 1,000 to 10,000 each year; about 1–2% of the applications were approved. The majority of applications were citizens of the former Soviet Union (in particular, Chechnya and Ukraine).

Following the Russian invasion of Ukraine on 24 February 2022, more than 7.2 million refugees fleeing Ukraine have been recorded across Europe, with the vast majority initially fleeing to the countries closest to its western border. According to the United Nations High Commissioner for Refugees (UNHCR), almost 1.5 million people fled to neighboring Poland.

== History ==
Following World War II, Poland became a communist country, and was a major refugee destination. The communist government allowed refugees only from countries affected by "class struggle" (such as Greece, Chile or Vietnam). It is estimated that the total number of refugees and asylum seekers who came to Poland in the period 1945–1989 was around 20,000–30,000 individuals. Following the fall of communism in 1989, Poland became a more appealing destination following its liberalization and a transition towards capitalistic and democratic society. UNHCR opened an office in Poland in 1992, following Poland's accession to the 1951 Refugee Convention and the 1967 Protocol. Among others, Poland became one of the destinations of refugees from former Soviet Union (in particular, Chechnya), Yugoslavia and Afghanistan. The number of refugees coming to Poland was still tiny compared to that coming to Western European countries; around 1,500 each year in the early 1990s. That number roughly doubled by late 1990s, and Polish government passed new laws as part of preparation for Poland's accession to the European Union. By early 2000s the number of people applying for refugee and asylum in Poland rose to 7,000. From 2010 the number has been oscillating at around 6–7,000 to 15,000: 10,000 in 2010 and 2012, 15,000 in 2013, 6,500 in 2014 and 12,000 in 2015.

Only about 1–2 percent of the applications were approved. In 2012, refugee status was granted to 106, while 477 received complementary protection. In 2013, 208 people received the refugee status, and 550 or complementary protection or "tolerated stay" category. About 85% of the individuals who apply for refugee status or asylum leave Poland, traveling to Western Europe, before the Polish agency makes a ruling, leading to their request being cancelled.

=== 2021–2022 Belarus–European Union border crisis ===
The 2021–2022 Belarus–European Union border crisis began sometime around 7 July 2021 when Belarusian president Alexander Lukashenko threatened to "flood" the EU with human traffickers, drug smugglers, and armed migrants. Later, Belarusian authorities and state-controlled tourist enterprises, together with some airlines operating in the Middle East, started promoting tours to Belarus by increasing the number of connections from the Middle East and giving those who bought them Belarusian visas, ostensibly for hunting purposes. Social media groups were additionally offering fraudulent advice on the rules of crossing the border to the prospective migrants, most of whom were trying to reach Germany. Those who arrived in Belarus were then given instructions about how and where to trespass the European Union (EU) border, and what to tell the border guards on the other side of the border. Migrants said that Belarus provided them with wire cutters and axes to cut through border fences and enter the EU; however, those who did not manage to cross the border were often forced to stay there by Belarusian authorities, who were accused of assaulting some migrants who failed to get across. Belarusian authorities later confirmed that the involvement of the border troops is "absolutely possible". Belarus refused to allow Polish humanitarian aid for the migrants, which would have included tents and sleeping bags.

Poland, Lithuania, and Latvia have described the crisis as hybrid warfare, calling the crisis an incident of human trafficking of migrants, waged by Belarus against the EU. The three governments declared a state of emergency and announced their decisions to build border walls on their borders with Belarus, with Poland approving an estimated €353 million in spending to build a 60 kilometres (37 mi) barrier. The EU sent additional supporting officers and patrol cars to Lithuania, and 12 EU governments stated their support for a physical barrier along the border.

In February 2025, the Polish parliament approved a law enabling the government to temporarily suspend the right to asylum for people irregularly crossing the border as part of an "instrumentalization of migration" by a foreign state. The measure authorizes the Interior Ministry to restrict this right for up to 60 renewable days in the event of a "serious and real threat to security". Certain categories remain protected, including minors and their families, pregnant women, people requiring special care, people deemed at "real risk of harm" if returned over the border, and citizens of the country carrying out the instrumentalization. This legislation has been criticized by the United Nations High Commissioner for Refugees as contrary to European and international law, while the parliament's Legislative Bureau and the Commissioner for Human Rights raised doubts as to its compatibility with the Polish Constitution concerning the restriction of rights and freedoms.

=== 2022 Ukrainian refugee crisis ===
The 2022 Russian invasion of Ukraine that started on 24 February led to the 2022 Ukrainian refugee crisis. By 6 September 2022, according to the UNHCR, almost 7.2 million Ukrainian refugees left the territory of Ukraine, with the vast majority initially fleeing to the countries closest to its western border. Almost 1.4 million people fled to neighboring Poland.

== Demographics ==
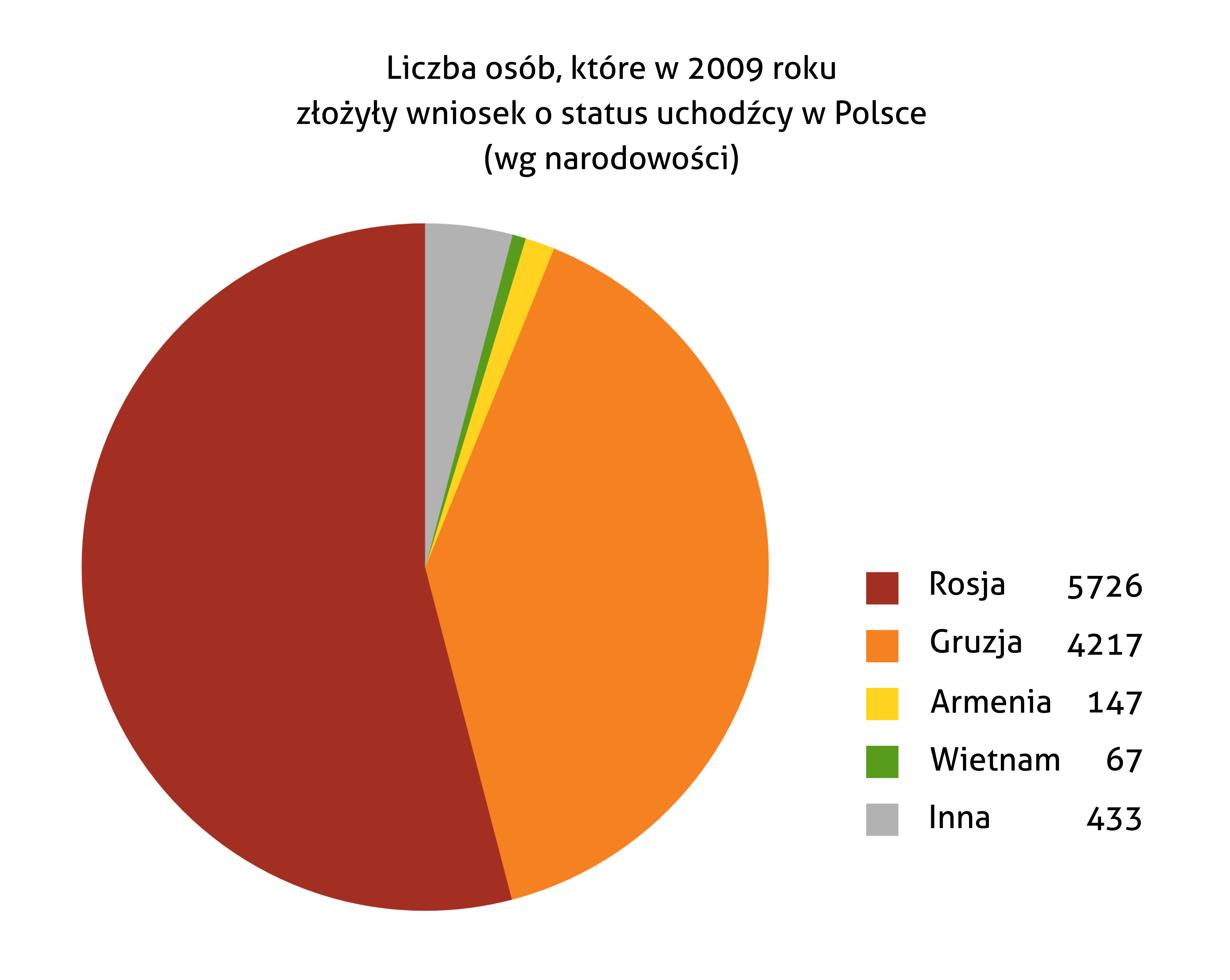
Total applications for refugee status in Poland by nationality, 2009

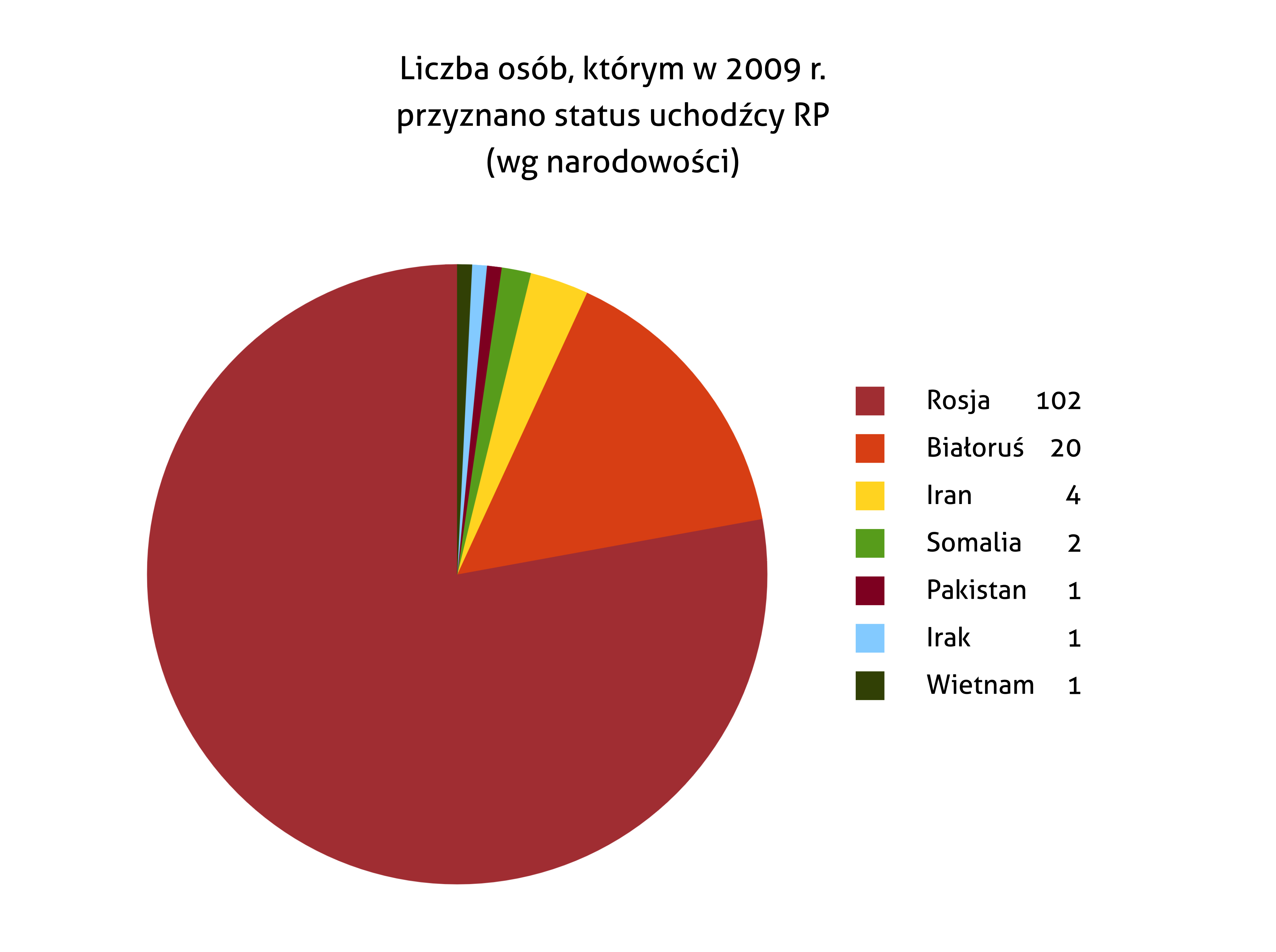
Approved applications for refugee status in Poland by nationality, 2009

The largest refugee group in Poland are people from the former Soviet Union; prior to the 2022 Russian invasion of Ukraine each year since 2000 this group formed between 40–90% of the individuals applying for refugee status in Poland; out of those, the largest group were Chechens, who started applying for it at the start of the 21st century, following the Chechen Civil War. It is estimated there may be about 20,000 Chechens in Poland as of mid-2010s. The second largest group were the Ukrainians, who started applying for that status following the Ukrainian-Russian conflict; approximately 1 thousand to 2 thousand or more Ukrainians have been applying for the stay in Poland since the onset of that conflict. The third largest group applying for stay in Poland are people from Georgia.

Since the start of the Syrian Civil War, between a hundred and three hundred Syrians have been applying for refugee status in Poland each year.

== Attitude towards refugees ==
Over the past few decades, many Poles emigrated abroad seeking better jobs. This has been cited as one of the reasons Poles in 2000s have held some of the most pro-immigration, pro-refugee and pro-asylum-seekers views in Europe. This attitude started to change around 2015, following the onset of the European migrant crisis. Polish governments have not been supportive of the EU plans to distribute refugees throughout Europe, including Poland. Attitudes towards refugees have worsened. A nationwide poll from December 2016 showed that 52% do not wish for any refugees to arrive in Poland, 40% approve only of temporary resettlement, and only 4% approve of permanent resettlement. More Polish people were favorable of refugees from Ukraine than from Middle East.

Opinion polls conducted between February 28 and March 10, 2022, during a period of significant influx of refugees immediately after the start of the 2022 Russian invasion of Ukraine, showed that the Polish society overwhelmingly supported helping Ukrainian refugees who were fleeing from war. Later polls taken at the turn of March and April also confirmed this sentiment.

In 2024, a survey conducted by the University of Warsaw and VIZJA University revealed that the positive sentiment towards Ukrainian refugees and their provision of assistance in Poland is in decline. According to the survey, the perceived 'demanding attitude' of the Ukrainian immigrants is the main reason for this decline. However, 82% of the respondents still support the admission of Ukrainian children into Polish schools.

== See also ==
- 2022 Ukrainian refugee crisis – Ongoing refugee crisis in Europe
- Borders of Poland – Political boundaries between Poland and neighboring territories
- Chechen refugees
- Immigration to Poland
