= TUGA radar =

Polish 4D military radar

TUGA
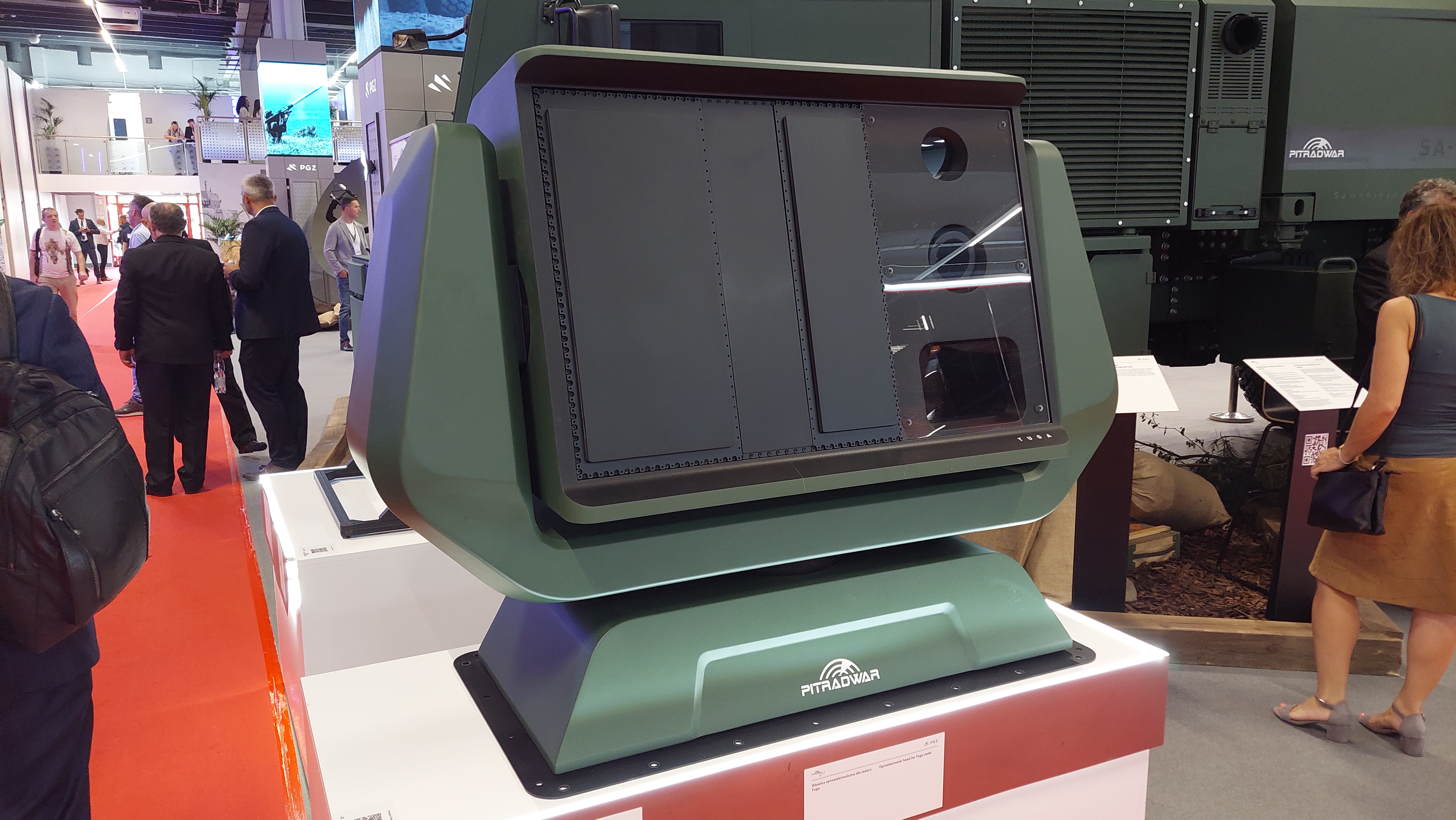
- TUGA X-band radar prototype at MSPO 2024
- Country of origin: Poland
- Manufacturer: PIT-RADWAR
- Introduced: 2024 (demonstrator)
- Type: 4D active electronically scanned array radar
- Frequency: X-band (8–12 GHz)
- Range: 50 m–50 km
- Height: 700 mm
- Width: 700 mm
- Azimuth: 90° per antenna panel; 360° depending on configuration
- Elevation: 33°

TUGA is a Polish military radar under development by PIT-RADWAR, designed to detect and track aerial targets, including unmanned aerial vehicles (UAVs), helicopters and aircraft. It is a four-dimensional (4D) radar that measures three target position coordinates as well as radial velocity, while its operating modes and parameters are software-defined.

== Development ==
TUGA was first publicly presented by PIT-RADWAR at MSPO 2024, where it was one of three systems receiving their first public presentation from the company. Later defence-industry publications reported that the radar was being developed by PIT-RADWAR's Gdańsk branch. At MSPO 2025, two further configurations were presented: a portable version with a single rotating antenna mounted on a tripod, and a four-panel configuration integrated with the SA-35 self-propelled anti-aircraft gun.

In April 2025, PIT-RADWAR also presented TUGA during a meeting between Polish manufacturers of drone and counter-drone systems and Deputy Prime Minister and Minister of National Defence Władysław Kosiniak-Kamysz.

One of the first publicly demonstrated applications of the radar was its integration with the SA-35 demonstrator, in which TUGA forms part of a hybrid fire-control system operating together with the ZGS-35K electro-optical tracking head. The configuration presented with the SA-35 used four flat antenna panels positioned around the vehicle, a layout intended to provide continuous 360° azimuth coverage. Defence24 also described TUGA as a compact radar that could serve as a detection and tracking sensor in very-short-range air-defence systems.

In September 2025, TUGA project manager Piotr Rycio stated that the radar remained a demonstrator undergoing testing. PIT-RADWAR planned to build a prototype in 2026 and subsequently manufacture a short series of radars using the company's own funds. According to PIT-RADWAR's management report, as summarised by Defence24, the radar is intended for use in air-defence systems, applications for the Polish Navy, counter-UAS systems and the East Shield programme.

== Design and specifications ==
TUGA is a 4D radar using an active electronically scanned array (AESA), operating in the X band (8–12 GHz) and employing frequency-modulated continuous-wave (FMCW) technology. The 700 × 700 mm antenna unit consists of two antennas, one transmitting and one receiving. The transmitter section uses gallium nitride (GaN) semiconductor technology.

A single antenna panel covers 33° in elevation and 90° in azimuth. Depending on the configuration, the radar can operate sectorially, provide 360° coverage through mechanical rotation of the antenna, or use four antenna panels for continuous 360° surveillance. Its stated instrumented range is from 50 m to 50 km. For a target with a radar cross-section of 0.01 m², a detection range exceeding 5 km has been reported. Earlier reporting by Defence24 similarly gave the overall detection range as 50 m to 50 km and approximately 5 km for small UAVs. According to Polska Zbrojna, the radar weighs less than 50 kg.

According to PIT-RADWAR, TUGA is intended for the detection and tracking of aircraft, helicopters and unmanned aerial vehicles. Its software-defined operating characteristics allow its capabilities to be adapted to the requirements of a particular application or mission. The compact panel design allows the radar to be used as a portable system or integrated with mobile platforms and stationary installations. According to the project's manager, it may also be installed on combat vehicles, trailers and ships. Defence-industry publications have presented TUGA primarily as a lightweight sensor for detecting small UAVs, while also describing it as capable of supporting weapon guidance against detected targets.
