= 2023 Polish referendum =

Polish referendum in October 2023

- 15 October 2023
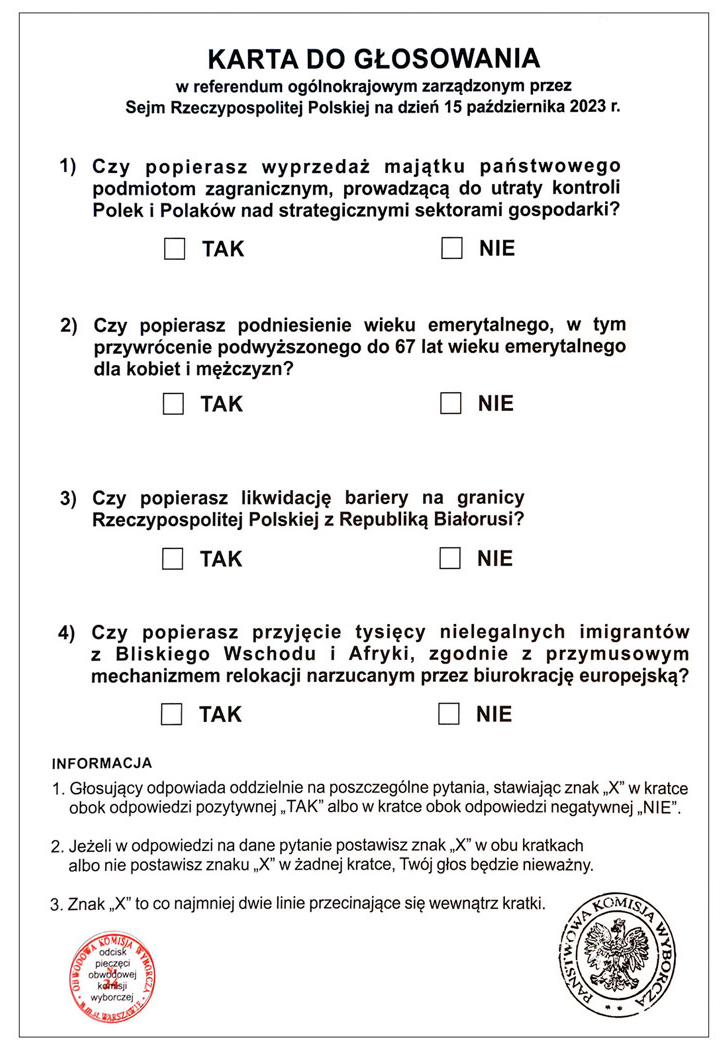
- Voting system: Majority vote
- Outcome: Referendum failed because the required turnout of 50% of eligible voters was not reached.
- Website: Official website
- 1. Do you support the selling off of state assets to foreign entities, leading to the loss of Poles' control over strategic sectors of the economy?

Results
| Choice | Votes | % |
|---|---|---|
| Yes | 394,704 | 3.51% |
| No | 10,857,496 | 96.49% |
| Valid votes | 11,252,200 | 93.13% |
| Invalid or blank votes | 830,388 | 6.87% |
| Total votes | 12,082,588 | 100.00% |
| Registered voters/turnout | 29,532,595 | 40.91% |
- 2. Do you support an increase in the retirement age, including the restoration of the increased retirement age to 67 for men and women?

Results
| Choice | Votes | % |
|---|---|---|
| Yes | 608,254 | 5.39% |
| No | 10,675,211 | 94.61% |
| Valid votes | 11,283,465 | 93.39% |
| Invalid or blank votes | 799,123 | 6.61% |
| Total votes | 12,082,588 | 100.00% |
| Registered voters/turnout | 29,532,595 | 40.91% |
- 3. Do you support the removal of the barrier on the border between Poland and Belarus?

Results
| Choice | Votes | % |
|---|---|---|
| Yes | 445,270 | 3.96% |
| No | 10,808,410 | 96.04% |
| Valid votes | 11,253,680 | 93.14% |
| Invalid or blank votes | 828,908 | 6.86% |
| Total votes | 12,082,588 | 100.00% |
| Registered voters/turnout | 29,532,595 | 40.91% |
- 4. Do you support the admission of thousands of illegal immigrants from the Middle East and Africa, in accordance with the forced relocation mechanism imposed by the European bureaucracy?

Results
| Choice | Votes | % |
|---|---|---|
| Yes | 360,803 | 3.21% |
| No | 10,878,863 | 96.79% |
| Valid votes | 11,239,666 | 93.02% |
| Invalid or blank votes | 842,922 | 6.98% |
| Total votes | 12,082,588 | 100.00% |
| Registered voters/turnout | 29,532,595 | 40.91% |

A referendum was held in Poland on 15 October 2023, taking place alongside the nationwide elections to the Senate and Sejm.

Four questions had been announced by members of the government from 11 to 14 August. Voters were asked whether they approve of the privatisation of state-owned enterprises, an increase in the retirement age, the admission of immigrants under the EU relocation mechanism, and the removal of the barrier on Poland's border with Belarus. The referendum was boycotted by the main opposition parties resulting in a turnout of only 40% (compared to more than 70% for the election). As a result of not exceeding the minimum validity threshold of 50% turnout, the results were not legally binding, making the referendum an example of a successful no-show strategy.

== Questions ==
The referendum asked four questions:

1. "Do you support the selling off of state assets to foreign entities, leading to the loss of Poles' control over strategic sectors of the economy?" (Note: Polish: Czy popierasz wyprzedaż majątku państwowego podmiotom zagranicznym, prowadzącą do utraty kontroli Polek i Polaków nad strategicznymi sektorami gospodarki?) (Note: Originally the Privatization question was “Do you support the sell-off of state-owned enterprises?”. This would later change)
2. "Do you support an increase in the retirement age, including the restoration of the increased retirement age to 67 for men and women?" (Note: Polish: Czy popierasz podniesienie wieku emerytalnego, w tym przywrócenie podwyższonego do 67 lat wieku emerytalnego dla kobiet i mężczyzn?)
3. "Do you support the removal of the barrier on the border between the Republic of Poland and Republic of Belarus?" (Note: Polish: Czy popierasz likwidację bariery na granicy Rzeczypospolitej Polskiej z Republiką Białorusi?)
4. "Do you support the admission of thousands of illegal immigrants from the Middle East and Africa, in accordance with the forced relocation mechanism imposed by the European bureaucracy?" (Note: Polish: Czy popierasz przyjęcie tysięcy nielegalnych imigrantów z Bliskiego Wschodu i Afryki, zgodnie z przymusowym mechanizmem relokacji narzucanym przez biurokrację europejską?)

The questions were criticised by opposition parties and commentators as purportedly aimed at the opposition leader and former Prime Minister Donald Tusk. The ruling Law and Justice party was accused of inciting anti-immigrant sentiment to boost turnout among its voters on election day. The law had been changed shortly before the announcement of the referendum to allow it to be held on the same day as the parliamentary election, which was referred to as a way to skirt past electoral campaign budget limits by the incumbent Law and Justice party under the false pretense of referendum funding. The referendum questions were also phrased as leading or loaded questions.

Originally the Privatization question was “Do you support the sell-off of state-owned enterprises?”. This would later change to "Do you support the selling off of state assets to foreign entities, leading to the loss of Poles' control over strategic sectors of the economy?"

== Exit poll ==
In the IPSOS exit poll, it was reported that the voter turnout in the referendum was around 40%, which falls below the minimum validity threshold of 50%, indicating that the referendum is non-binding.

Distribution of votes in the exit poll questions according to IPSOS
| Question number | Yes | No |
|---|---|---|
| 1 (asset sale) | 2.5% | 97.5% |
| 2 (retirement age) | 4% | 96% |
| 3 (barrier elimination) | 2.2% | 97.8% |
| 4 (forced immigrant acceptance) | 1.4% | 98.6% |

Voter turnout by age groups according to IPSOS
| Age | Turnout |
|---|---|
| 18 – 29 | 32.5% |
| 30 – 39 | 40.3% |
| 40 – 49 | 40.2% |
| 50 – 59 | 45.7% |
| 60 and over | 40.6% |

== Result maps ==
Results by voivodeship

Question 1

Question 2

Question 3

Question 4
Turnout by voivodeship

Question 1

Question 2

Question 3

Question 4

== See also ==
- 2016 Hungarian migrant quota referendum
- 2022 Hungarian LGBT in education referendum
