= Belarus–Poland border barrier =

In-progress border wall

- Polish: Bariera na granicy polsko-białoruskiej
- Parts of the Belarus–Poland border
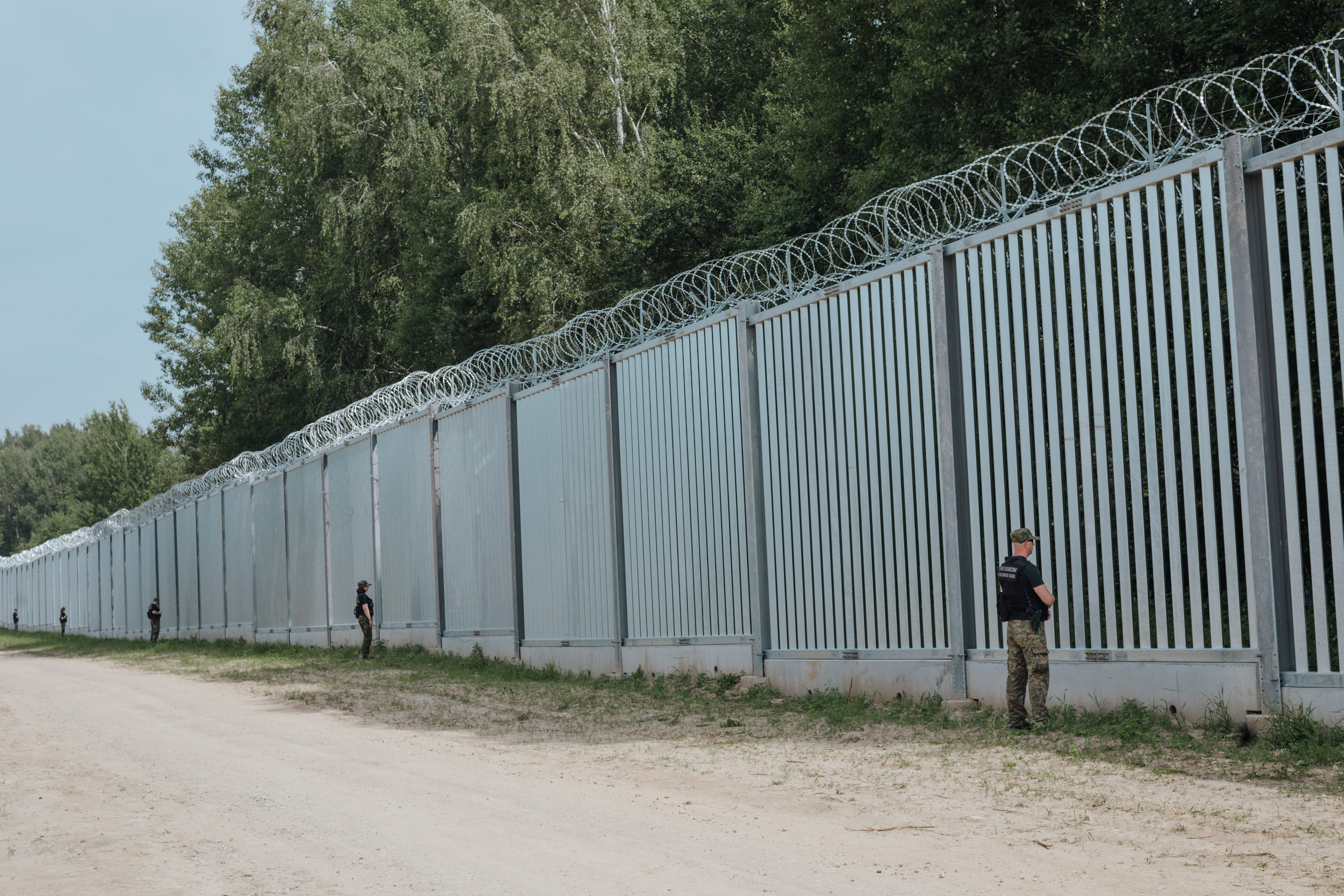
- Polish Border Guard officers stationed by the border wall in June 2022

Site information
- Type: Border barrier
- Operator: Border Guard of Poland
- Condition: Active

Location
- Height: 5.5 meters (18 feet)
- Length: 187 km (116 mi)

Site history
- Built: 2022
- Built by: Poland
- In use: 2022–present

On 25 January 2022, Poland began building a new border wall on the border with Belarus to prevent illegal immigration in the aftermath of the Belarus–European Union border crisis.

== Construction ==
Poland began work on the 5.5-metre-high (18 ft) steel wall topped with barbed wire at a cost of around 1.6 billion zł (US$407M) aimed at blocking the passage of illegal migrants during the border crisis in the region artificially instigated by Belarus in the late summer of 2021. The barrier was completed on 30 June 2022.

An electronic barrier 206km in length, mounting 3,000 cameras with night vision and movement sensors, was added to the fence between November 2022 and early summer 2023 at a cost of EUR 71.8 million.

== Criticism ==
Some media outlets, journalists, and public figures criticized the Polish government's construction of the border barrier, expressing concern that it could hinder access for individuals seeking asylum. However, Polish authorities maintained that the barrier was intended to prevent illegal crossings and enhance border security, and there were no widespread reports of asylum seekers being denied the opportunity to apply for protection through official channels. The Deputy Minister of the Interior and Administration stated that migrants requesting asylum in Poland are directed to refugee centers. During and after the most intense phase of the border crisis, official border crossings with Belarus remained open, and the asylum process continued to function – in 2022 alone, 1,029 applications were submitted in Terespol and 1,070 in the Podlaskie Voivodeship.

Since the fence was built, illegal crossings have reduced to a trickle; however, between August 2022 and February 2023, 37 bodies were found on both sides of the border; people have died mainly from hypothermia or drowning.

Ecologists have criticised the project, on the basis that populations of large mammals like lynx or European bisons are now separated.

== Attempted crossings ==
During 2022, Poland recorded 16,000 attempted crossings of the border. In 2023, the electronic sensors logged 22,000 in the first 8 months.

== History ==
On 15 October 2023, Poland held a referendum, with one of the four questions asked being: Do you support the removal of the barrier on the border between Poland and Belarus?

The referendum was not binding due to not reaching the required threshold of 50% of the electorate, with 40.91% turnout - an effect of the boycott organised by the opposition. Among those who took part, 96.04% responded No, while 3.96% supported its removal.

As of 4 June 2026, 107 people were known to have died crossing the border.

== See also ==
- East Shield – Polish defence initiative started in 2024
- Refugees in Poland
- Belarus–Poland relations
- Belarus–European Union relations
- Borders of Belarus
- Borders of Poland – Political boundaries between Poland and neighboring territories
- Polish Border Guard – Armed border guard of Poland
- State Border Committee of the Republic of Belarus – Armed border guard of Belarus
