= Kuźnica, Podlaskie Voivodeship =

Kuźnica
- Village
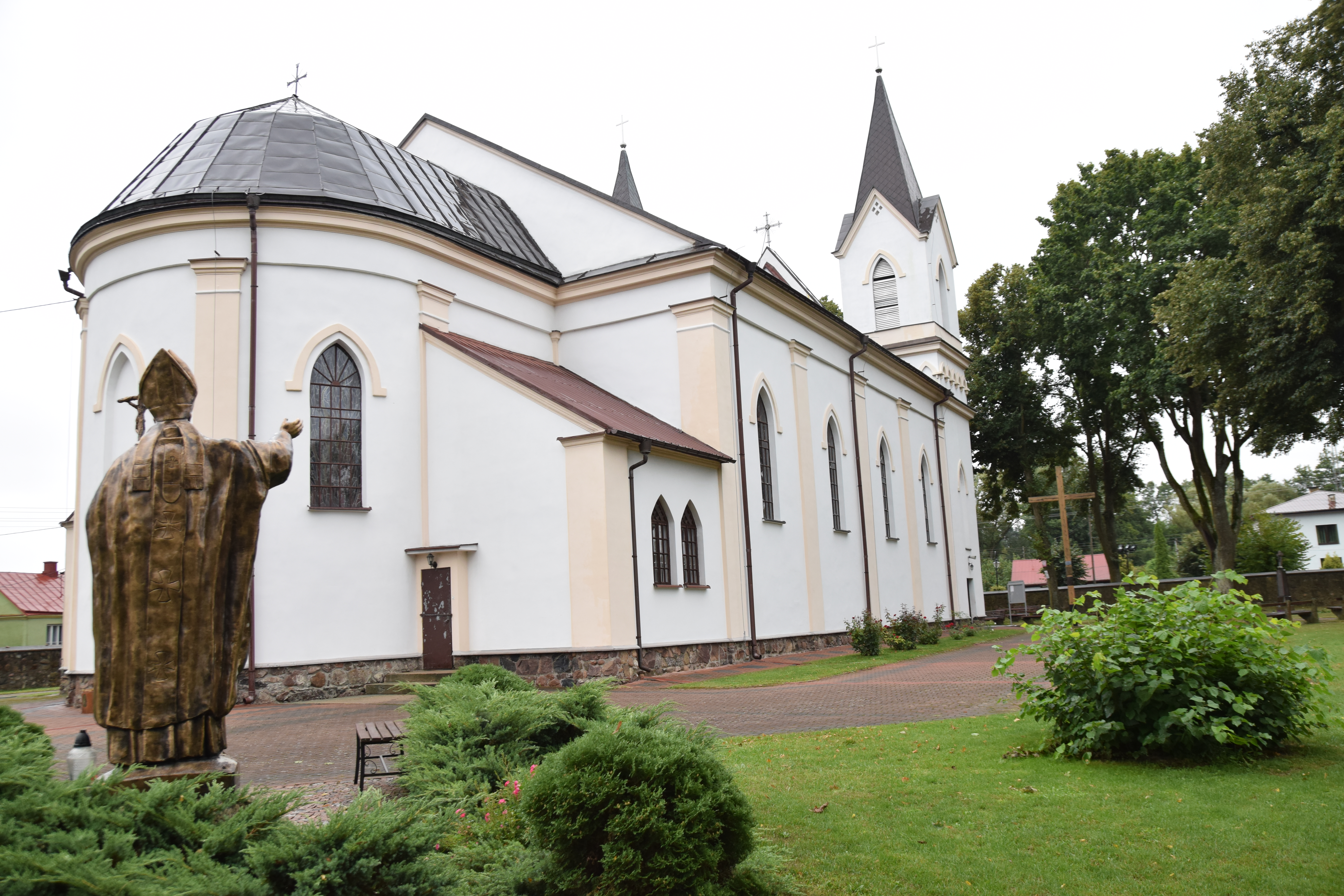
- Church of the Divine Providence

- Location within Poland
- Coordinates: 53°30′35″N 23°38′37″E
- Country: Poland
- Voivodeship: Podlaskie
- County: Sokółka
- Gmina: Kuźnica

Population (2019)
  - Total: 1,717
- Time zone: UTC+1 (CET)
  - Summer (DST): UTC+2 (CEST)
- Vehicle registration: BSK

Kuźnica (Polish: [kuʑˈɲit͡sa]; formerly Kuźnica Białostocka) is a village in Sokółka County, Podlaskie Voivodeship, in north-eastern Poland, close to the border with Belarus. It is the seat of the gmina (administrative district) called Gmina Kuźnica.

In 2019, the village had a population of 1,717.

== History ==
The beginning of the village was an ore plant - a plant for smelting iron from bog ores - founded on the Łosośna River around 1504. Soon, a princely manor was established. In 1536, on the orders of Queen Bona Sforza, Jerzy Zielepucha founded the town of Kuźnica, which in 1546 received Magdeburg rights. In 1545, Sigismund II Augustus founded a Catholic church. In 1679, the city had a market square and four streets. There was a royal pheasantry here.

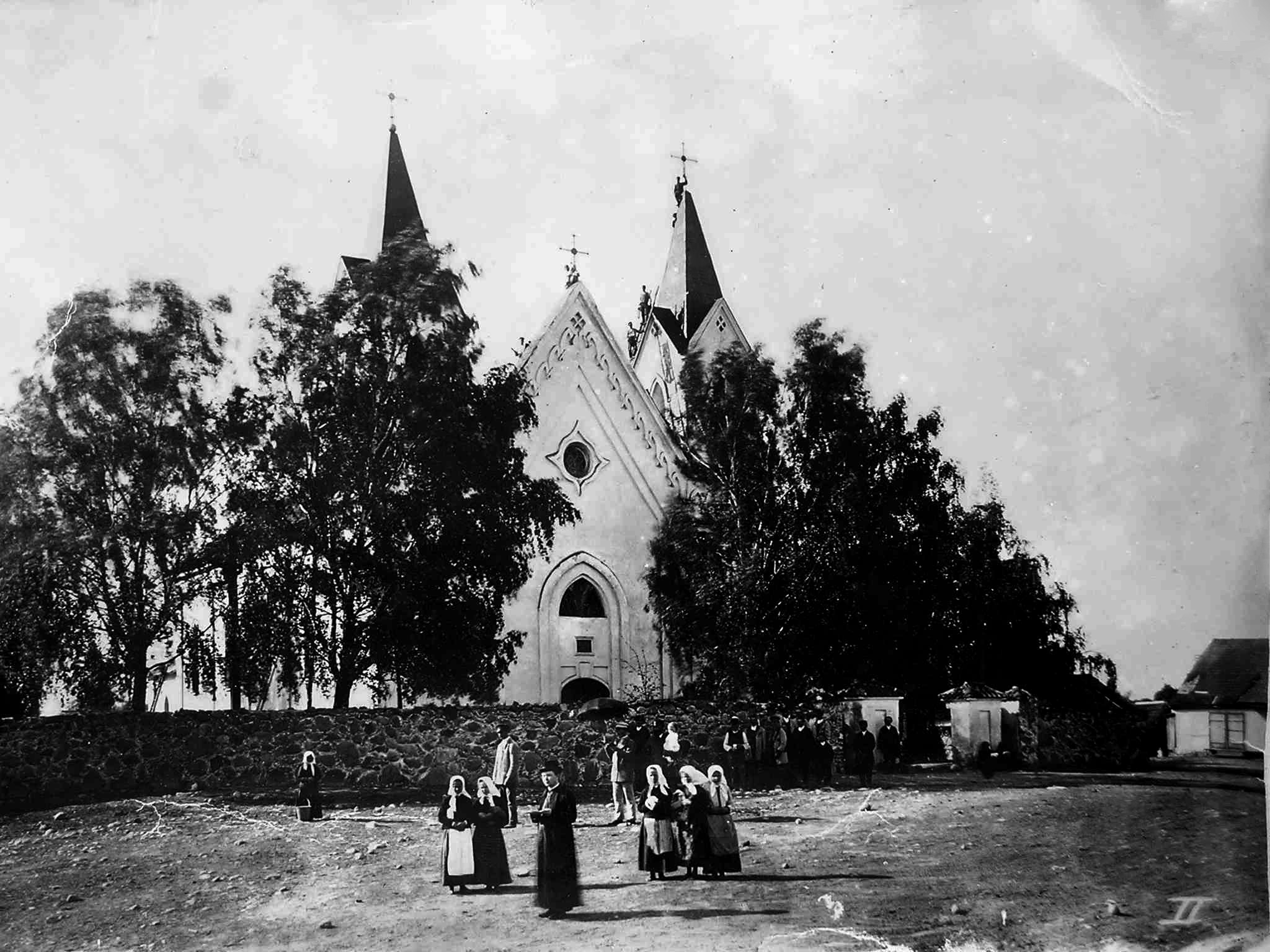
Church of the Divine Providence in c. 1900

After the Partitions of Poland, Kuźnica was initially part of the Prussian Partition (1795-1807), and then, from 1807, within the borders of the Russian Empire (Russian Partition), until independence was regained in 1918 (counting the German occupation of 1915-1918). Despite its favorable location on a navigable river and (since 1862) near the Saint Petersburg–Warsaw railway, the town did not develop into a larger city.

During the Polish–Soviet War (1919–1921), fierce battles took place around the city. During the fighting, with small Polish losses, the 18th Rifle Brigade of the Polish Armed Forces defending this sector was almost completely destroyed. In 1921, war damage resulted in the town being deprived of its city rights.

During the Nazi occupation, in the summer of 1941, the Germans created a ghetto for Jewish residents. There were about 1,000 people there. On November 2, 1942, the Germans finally liquidated the ghetto. Jews were deported to the Kiełbasin camp and the Treblinka extermination camp.

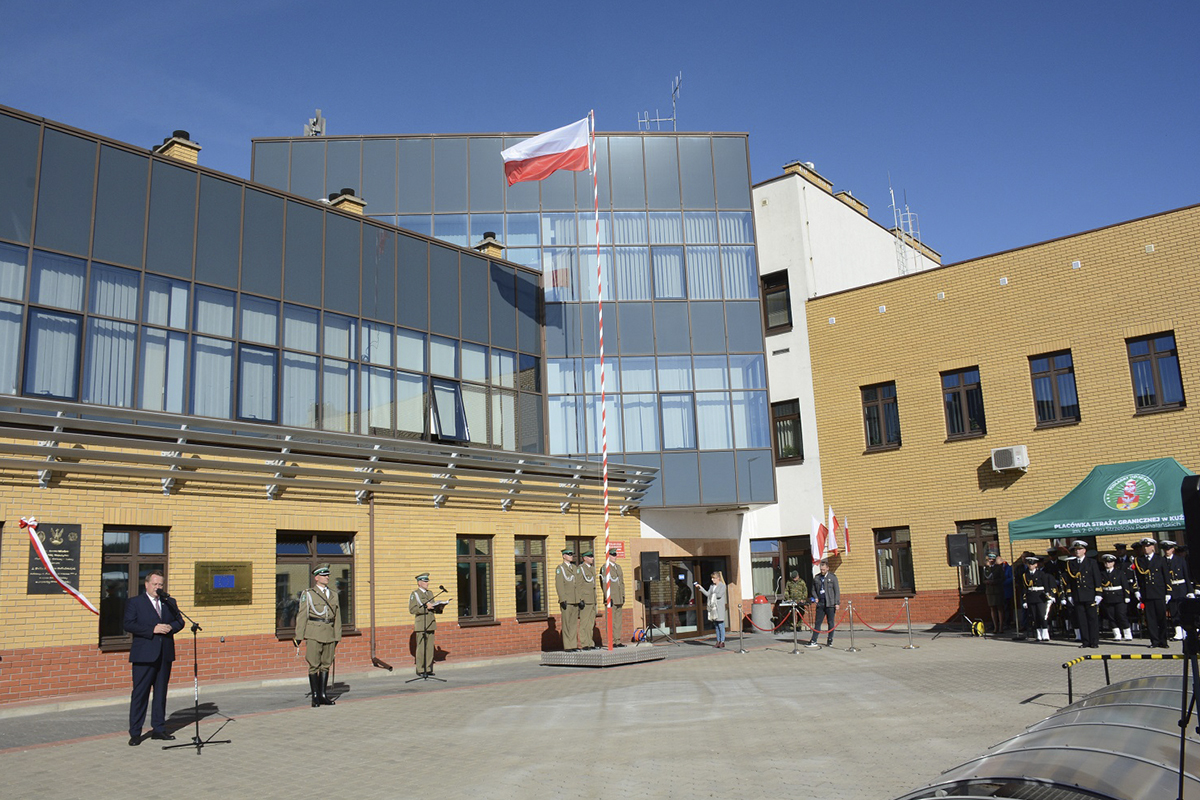
Polish Border Guard unit in Kuźnica

During the Polish People's Republic period, a guardhouse of the Border Protection Troops was stationed in Kuźnica and following the post-Communist reforms it has become a seat of a Polish Border Guard unit subordinated to the Podlaski Border Guard Regional Unit.

== Transport ==
The village close to the northeastern end of the Expressway S19. A major border crossing into Belarus is located near the village. The new checkpoint was funded by the European Union to be upgraded to EU standards as this became a Schengen external border entry point when Poland became part of the Schengen Area on 21 December 2007. The Belarus side of the crossing is called Bruzgi.

A station on the Rail Line 6 is situated to the north of the village. There is a passenger service to Białystok, but not anymore to Belarus (Bruzgi), although cross-border rail tracks exist. Both highway and railway going into Belarus connect Kuźnica with Grodno 25 km away.

== Demographics ==
Historical population
Year	Pop.	±%
1880	1,083	—
1897	1,346	+24.3%
1910	1,170	−13.1%
1921	1,075	−8.1%

In the 1921 census, 96.7% people declared Polish nationality, 2.2% declared Jewish nationality and 0.7% declared Belarusian nationality.
