= Anna Alboth =

Polish activist and journalist

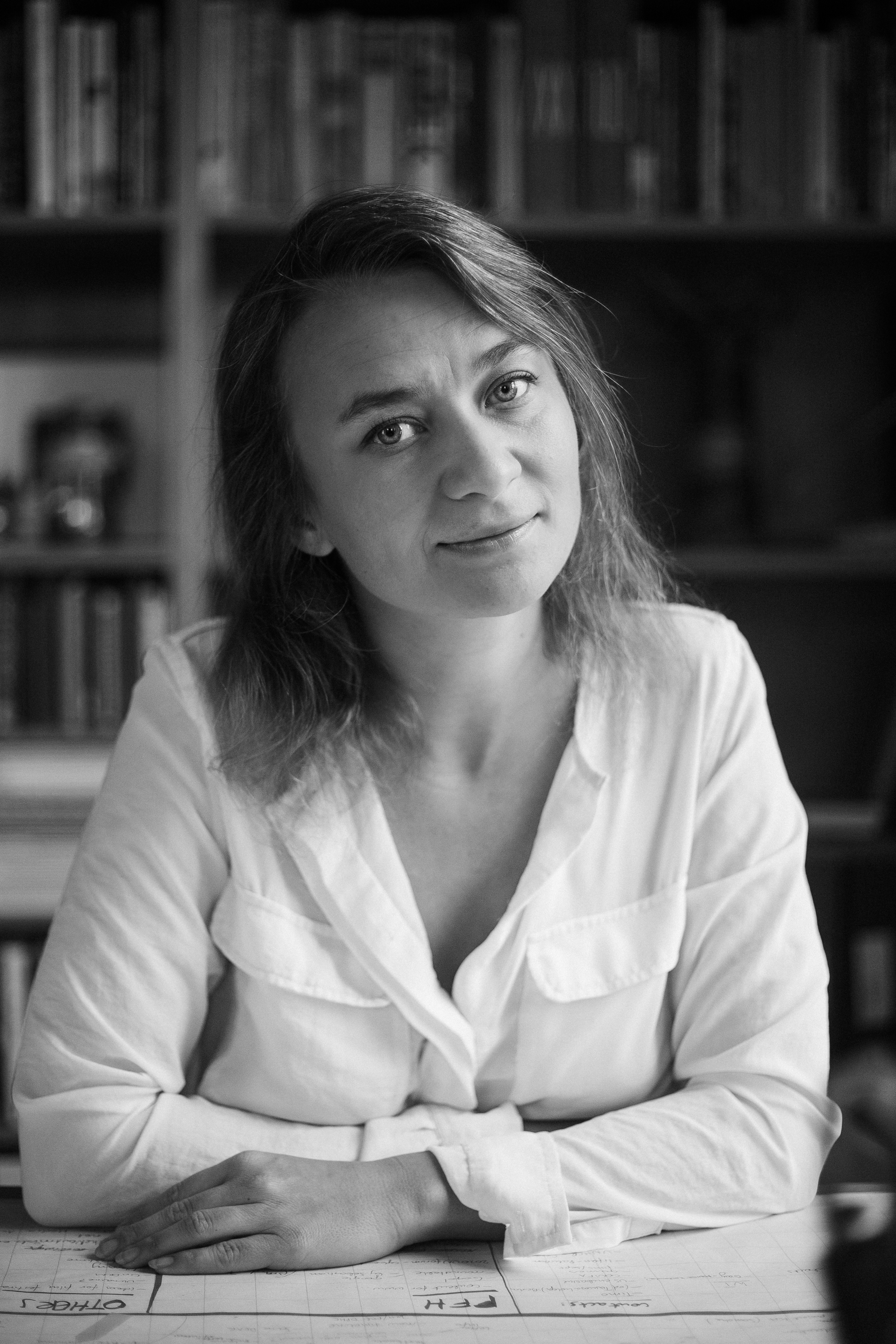
- Anna Alboth (2019)
- Born: 1984 (age 41–42)
- Citizenship: Polish
- Occupations: Journalist, human rights defender

Anna Alboth (born 1984) is a Polish journalist and human rights defender. She gained international attention as the initiator of the Civil March for Aleppo—a peace march on foot from Berlin to Aleppo from December 2016 to August 2017, for which she was nominated for the Nobel Peace Prize in 2018.

For years she was involved in different human rights initiatives, in Poland and internationally. She works as Global Media Officer for Minority Rights Group International.

In the summer of 2021, Alboth co-initiated Grupa Granica—a collective of Polish human rights organizations that care for refugees on the Belarusian–Polish border.

== Life and career ==
Alboth went to school in Warsaw. In 2009 she finished her studies at the University of Warsaw. As student journalist she started working at the Polish daily newspaper Gazeta Wyborcza.. For years she was cooperating with different Polish media outlets.

In 2009, she and her husband Thomas Alboth launched the travel blog The Family Without Borders, which won National Geographic Poland's "Travel Blog of the Year" in 2011. Publications in the Polish National Geographic and other travel magazines followed, as well as a travel book about Central America in 2016.

While living in Berlin in the times of the 2015 European migrant crisis, she used the popularity of the travel blog and social media to collect sleeping bags in Poland and clothing for refugees waiting on the streets in Berlin for their asylum procedure. In December 2016, she initiated the Civil March for Aleppo, for which she was nominated for the Nobel Peace Prize in 2018.

Since 2018, she has been working as a global media officer for the human rights organization Minority Rights Group International. In the summer of 2021, she was a co-initiator and then a member of Grupa Granica.

She is an author of dozens of articles and opinion pieces, on the topic of human rights, mainly minorities and migration. She has published in Guardian, weekend Gazeta.pl, magazine Pismo (monthly) and others, giving the space and light to discriminated voices. She runs her special series ("Double Voices") of stories written together with local journalist, in monthly Znak.

She has received various media awards: in June 2024, Anna Alboth received the Journalism Excellence Award from the Council of Europe for her reportage on Ukrainian Roma migrants, in October 2024, she was awarded the Recherchepreis Osteuropa – Prize for Hope in Eastern Europe, recognizing her long-form investigative reporting on migration issues and in October 2024, she received a media fund grant from the Foundation for Polish-German Cooperation, supporting her cross-border journalistic work.

In recent years, Alboth has become increasingly involved in international advisory and innovation networks focused on migration and minority rights. Since 2024, she has been a member of the Ashoka Hello Europe Accelerator, a program supporting social innovation on migration across the continent. That same year, she joined a delegation of the Open World Program hosted by the U.S. Congress, visiting Washington and Arizona. In 2023, Alboth became a member and advisor at the Towards Dialogue Foundation (Fundacja w Stronę Dialogu), which advocates for Roma communities in Poland and Ukraine. She also serves on the advisory board of A World of Neighbours, a European network of practitioners working on grassroots migration and integration efforts.

Beyond her activism, Alboth continues to be deeply engaged in advocacy via journalism. She has led more than 40 political briefings and 20 media conferences related to the humanitarian situation at the Polish–Belarusian border, and contributed to public discourse through advocacy efforts tied to the film Green Border. As Global Media Officer for Minority Rights Group International since 2018, she has conducted global media advocacy campaigns and led training programs for over 400 journalists from Europe and West Africa. Alboth also acts as a frequent jury member in media competitions hosted by organizations such as the United Nations and the International Press Institute.

She lives with her family in Berlin.

== Publications ==
- Rodzina bez granic w Ameryce Środkowej. Warsaw: Agora, 2016. ISBN 978-83-268-2374-9.
- some of the media stories in monthly Znak
- some of the media stories in gazeta.pl
