= Bruzhi =

Village in Grodno Region, Belarus

Bruzhi Брузгі (Belarusian) Брузги (Russian)
- Village
- Interactive map of Bruzhi
- Location within Belarus
- Coordinates: 53°33′19″N 23°40′54″E
- Country: Belarus
- Region: Grodno Region
- District: Grodno District
- Time zone: UTC+3 (MSK)
- Area code: +375-15

Bruzhi (Belarusian: Брузгі; Russian: Брузги, romanized: Bruzgi) is a village in Grodno District, Grodno Region, in western Belarus. It is administratively part of Adelsk selsoviet and located close to the border with Poland. The Kuźnica-Bruzhi border crossing is located near the village. Klachki and Trubka are two villages nearby.

== History ==
According to the 1921 census, Bruzgi had a population of 151, entirely Polish by nationality and Catholic by confession.

During World War II, Bruzgi was occupied by the Soviet Union from 1939 to 1941, then by Nazi Germany until 1944, and then re-occupied by the Soviet Union afterwards.

Between 1940 and 1959, the village served as the administrative center of Bruzgi rural council (selsoviet). Until 2002, it was part of Padlabyennye rural council.

=== 21st century ===
In 2021, refugees, primarily Iraqi, entered the vicinity of Bruzgi, intending to depart from there to cross the Polish Border at Kuźnica. In response, the Polish government declared a state of emergency, stationing over 12,000 troops at the border. Politicians from Poland and the European Union accused Belarusian President Alexander Lukashenko of using the migrants as a form of "hybrid warfare" to destabilize Poland and other EU member countries.
