= East Shield =

Polish defence initiative started in 2024

- Tarcza Wschód
- Poland

Site information
- Type: Defensive line
- Controlled by: Polish Armed Forces

Site history
- Built: 2024

Storage of components for the construction of the East Shield

East Shield (Polish: Tarcza Wschód) is a national defense initiative launched by the Polish government to fortify its eastern borders with Belarus and the Russian exclave of Kaliningrad. The program represents one of the most significant investments in national security and border defense in Poland's post-war history.

== Program ==
The Polish government announced the East Shield program on May 18, 2024. The program aims to enhance Poland's military readiness and border security through a comprehensive mix of modern surveillance systems, physical barriers, and infrastructure development.

The program is backed by a substantial investment of over 10 billion Polish złoty (approximately US$2.55 billion), which will be allocated over the next four years. This funding will support the construction and deployment of various defence installations along the border.

=== Physical barriers ===
East Shield includes the erection of physical barriers designed to impede and control movement across the border. These barriers serve both as a deterrent and as a means to delay potential incursions.

=== Electronic warfare systems ===
A key feature of the program is the deployment of advanced surveillance systems, some of which are powered by artificial intelligence. These systems encompass a range of capabilities, including imagery intelligence (IMINT), signals intelligence (SIGINT), and acoustic monitoring.

The border will be equipped with a series of base stations and masts that house the warning and tracking systems. These installations will also facilitate encrypted communications, electronic warfare, and anti-drone measures.

Operational centers for data analysis will be established to integrate the information gathered by the surveillance systems. These centers will leverage AI to process data and connect with weapon systems automatically.

== Reception ==
Poland has expressed its intention to collaborate with NATO partners and the European Union on the East Shield program. The initiative is seen as a pivotal project that will reshape the security dynamics in the region, particularly in light of the collective defense of the eastern flank of NATO. The announcement of East Shield has been met with support from various quarters, including the Baltic states, which share similar security concerns. The program is viewed as a proactive measure to bolster regional stability and deter potential aggression.

== See also ==
- Belarus–Poland border barrier
- Baltic Defence Line : a similar project of defensive line undertaken by Estonia, Latvia and Lithuania along their borders with Russia and Belarus
