= History of the flags of Romania =

The colors of the national flag of Romania (Romanian: Drapelul României) have a long history, though the association of the three colors only dates to the 18th century. Red, yellow and blue were found on late 16th-century royal grants of Michael the Brave, as well as shields and banners. Thus, the late 13th century Wijnbergen armorial shows the coat of arms of the Wallachian ruler Litovoi as consisting of a shield of ten vertically alternating gold-and-red bands. The same two colors, gules and or, also appeared on the late 15th century flag and coat of arms of Moldavia, during the reign of Stephen the Great. Then, from the late 16th century until the mid-17th century, the historical coat of arms of Transylvania gradually developed as a shield party per fess, consisting of a black eagle on blue background in the upper field, a dividing red band in the middle, and seven red towers on golden background in the lower field. Finally, in the last quarter of the 18th century, Bukovina gets its own coat of arms from the Habsburg Empire, a blue-and-red shield party per pale with a black aurochs' head in the middle, and three golden six-pointed stars surrounding it. During the Wallachian uprising of 1821, these three colors were present, along others, on the canvas of the revolutionaries' flag and its fringes; for the first time a meaning was attributed to them: "Liberty (blue-sky), Justice (yellow field), Fraternity ( blood)".

== Tricolor ==
The tricolor was first adopted in Wallachia in 1834, when the reforming domnitor Alexandru II Ghica submitted naval and military colors designs for the approval of Sultan Mahmud II. The latter was a "flag with a red, blue and yellow face, also having stars and a bird's head in the middle". Soon, the order of colors was changed, with yellow appearing in the center. When the flags were handed over for use, Ghica remarked:

The flags of this divinely preserved land have since antiquity been the pride of its soldiers and the symbols of its glory ... The Romanian militia, organized on the basis of European rules and discipline, once again secures this ancient right and receives its flags with the national colors and the principality's eagle. My Lordship now entrusts to the infantry battalions and the cavalry divisions these flags as a sacred repository of gratitude, faith and obedience to the established laws...

In 1840, in order to differentiate the military colors from the war flag, Ghica adopted a new design for the former: a red-yellow-blue tricolor, with red on top and stripes of equal width. In the center was a white shield bordered with gold and decorated with the Wallachian eagle, wearing the princely crown and with a cross in its beak.

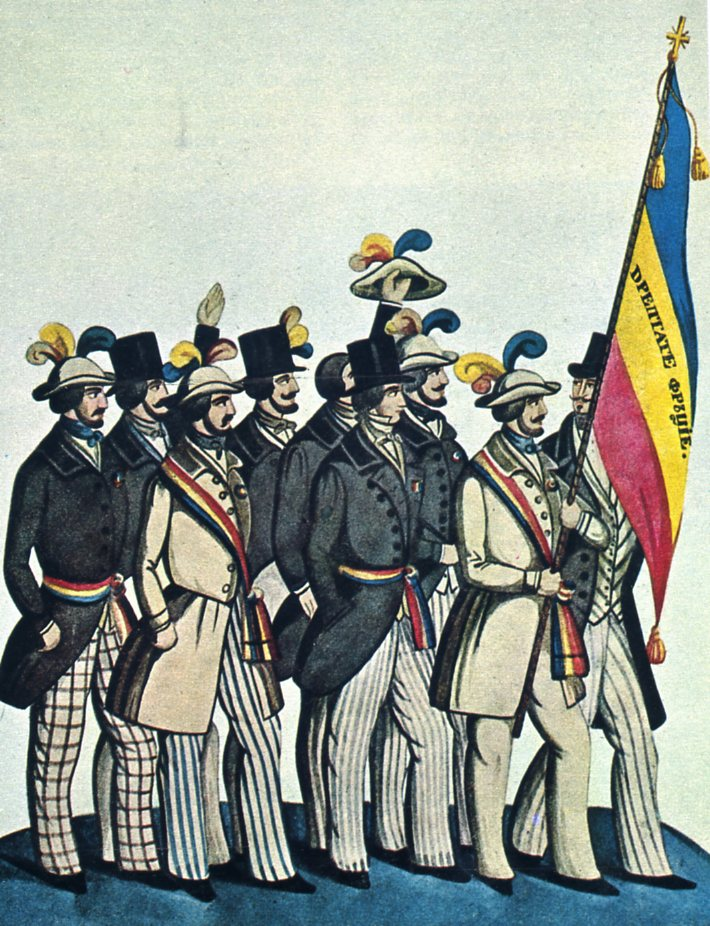
1848 Tricolor inscribed "Dreptate, Frăție": watercolor by C. Petrescu

In 1848, the flag adopted for Wallachia by the revolutionaries that year was a blue-yellow-red tricolor (with blue above, in line with the meaning "Liberty, Justice, Fraternity"). Already on 26 April, according to Gazeta de Transilvania, Romanian students in Paris were hailing the new government with a blue, gold and red national flag, "as a symbol of union between Moldavians and Muntenians".

The flag with horizontal stripes

Decree nr. 1 of 14/26 June 1848 of the provisional government mentioned that "the National Flag will have three colors: blue, yellow, red", emblazoned with the words "DPEПTATE ФPЪЦIE" (Dreptate, Frăție or "Justice, Fraternity", in the Romanian transitional alphabet). It differed from earlier tricolors in that the blue stripe was on top, the princely symbol was eliminated from the corners, as was the crown atop the eagle at the end of the flagpole, while a motto was now present. These flags were blessed the following day, being intended for use by the National Guard. Today only the Slatina city guard's flag survives. On the blue stripe appear the words (Frăție Dreptate or "Fraternity, Justice"), on the yellow — (Județul Oltŭ or "Olt County") and on the red — (Orașul Slatina or "The City of Slatina"). It is 124 centimeter long and 110 centimeter wide. The existence of similar flags is confirmed by records, which in some cases even mention the manufacturer's price. Thus, the police observer's flag (made of chalon or cloth friezed on both sides) and that of the Bucharest dorobanți detachment (made of Tibet wool) together cost 192 lei and 10 parale. Decree nr. 5 of 18 June ordered garrisons to store old flags in warehouses: "it being necessary to change flags, new flags will soon be sent to you". On 25 June, General Christian Tell asked the provisional government to approve the manufacture of six flags (three for the infantry and three for the cavalry), following which they would be "submitted to the provisional government for approval". His request was granted on 11 July, though the flags were not distributed until 11 September, in a solemn ceremony. On 30 June, Metropolitan Neofit, as prime minister, gave the following disposition: "the standards of liberty will be raised on all buildings, and the insignia will be carried". These symbols were widely employed in demonstrations and raised on public buildings, boats, warships, etc.

The flag with vertical stripes

Nevertheless, decree nr. 252 of 13/25 July 1848, issued because "it has not [yet] been agreed how the national standards should be designed", defined the flag as three vertical stripes, possibly influenced by the French model. The shades were "dark blue, light yellow and carmine red"; as for order, "near the wood comes blue, then yellow and then red fluttering".

Petre Vasiliu-Năsturel observes that from a heraldic point of view, on the French as well as the revolutionary Wallachian flag, the middle stripe represents a heraldic metal (argent and or respectively). Other writers believe that the tricolor was not an imitation of the French flag, instead embodying an old Romanian tradition. This theory is supported by a note from the revolutionary foreign minister to Emin Pasha: "the colors of the band that we the leaders wear, as well as all our followers, are not of modern origin. We have had our flags since an earlier time. When we received the tricolor insignia and bands we did not follow the spirit of imitation or fashion".

Earlier, at the Sibiu Conference of 26 April/8 May 1848, Transylvanian revolutionaries had also adopted a blue-white-red national flag (vertical, according to the memoirs of George Bariț). It was emblazoned with the words "VIRTUTEA ROMANĂ REÎNVIATĂ" ("ROMAN VIRTUE RESURRECTED"). A number of contemporary sources attests these colors (including the Blaj newspaper Organul naționale and Alexandru Papiu Ilarian's Istorie a românilor din Dacia superioară). They had a twofold significance: their importance in Romanian costume and their union of the Transylvanian principality's old colors (blue and red) with the white symbolizing peace. It appears that the two specimens with blue-yellow-red stripes preserved today at the National Museum of Romanian History were made later to commemorate the events at Blaj; yellow replaced white as a symbol of Romanian Transylvanians' desire to join Romania.

After the revolution was quelled, the old flags were restored and the revolutionaries punished for having worn the tricolor. In 1849, domnitor Barbu Dimitrie Știrbei adopted a new design for military colors that nevertheless preserved the colors' horizontal layout and only changed decorative elements. Similar to the 1834 flag, this one lasted until 1856.

During the Caimacam of three (October 1858 – January 1859), as the acting regents did not have the right to inscribe their initials on military flags, the monograms of the Wallachian domnitori were replaced by eagles.

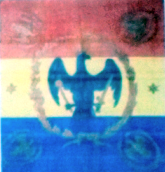
War flag of the Principality of Wallachia, 1834 design (a clearer image here).

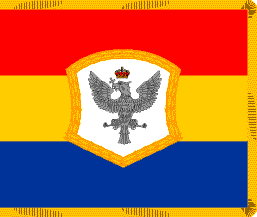
War flag of the Principality of Wallachia, 1840–1848

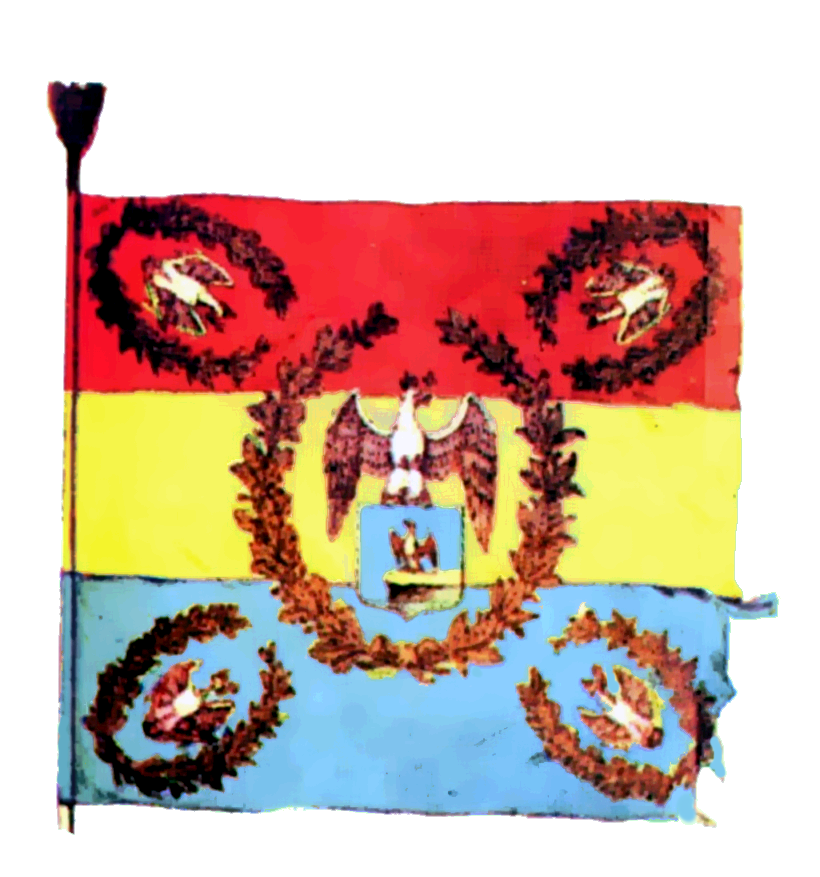
Military colors of the Argeș County dorobanți, 1852 design. The national military colors was the same, except for the district coat of arms in the talons of the middle eagle.

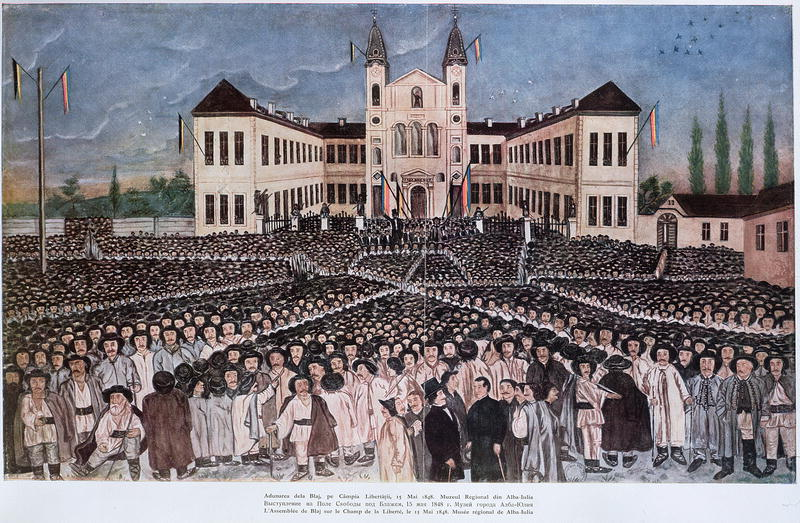
Period painting depicting the Second Blaj Assembly (3/15 May 1848)

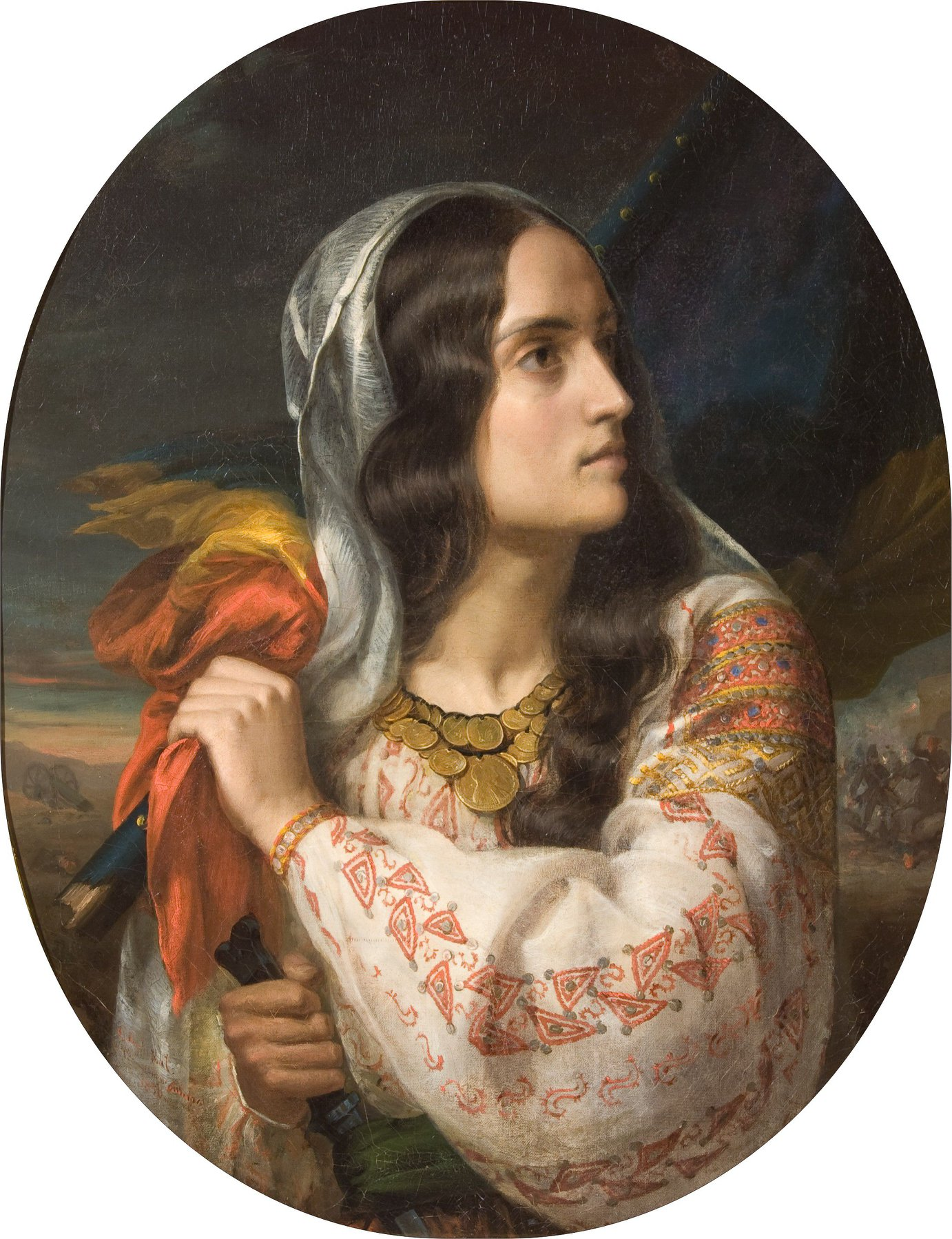
Revolutionary Romania. Painting by C. D. Rosenthal.

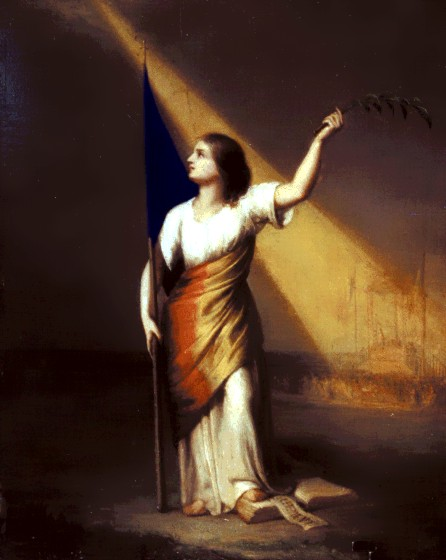
Romania Breaking off Her Chains on the Field of Liberty. Painting by C. D. Rosenthal. The flag is of the vertical design.

=== Merger legend ===
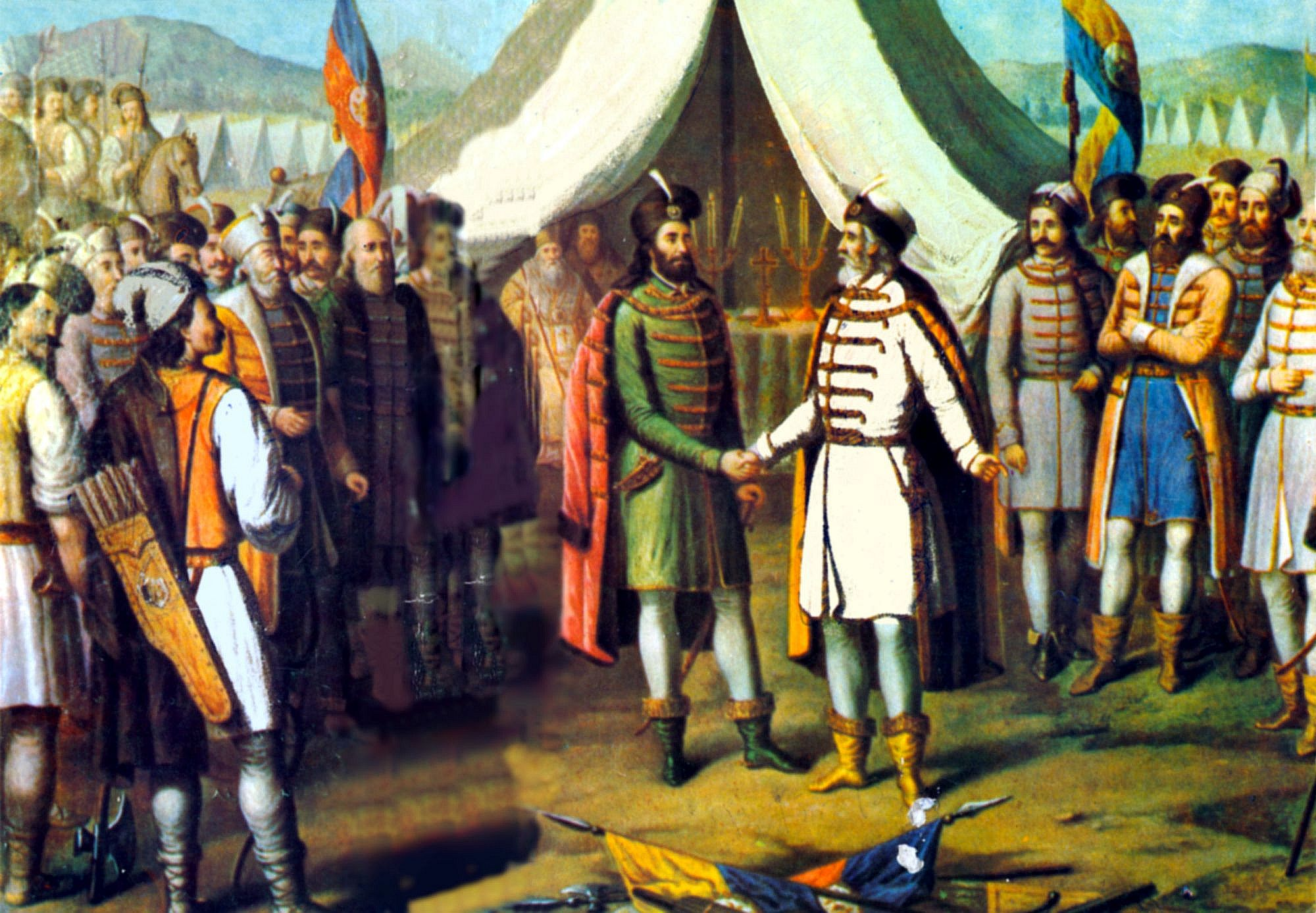
Constantin Lecca – Moldavians and Muntenians become brothers

After 1860, a legend arose stating that the national tricolor had been formed by merging the colors of the Moldavian and Wallachian flags, probably out of a desire to reconcile all parties to the choice of the Wallachian revolutionary flag of 1848 for all of Romania. This legend was also convenient with respect to the colors attributed to the two principalities' flags at the time (red and blue for Moldavia and blue and yellow for Wallachia).

The legend inspired a number of artworks, including a painting by Constantin Lecca. Wishing to depict the brotherhood between Moldavians and Wallachians, he chose a passage from the Bistrița Chronicle: "In the year 7015 (1506), 28 October, prince Ioan Bogdan Voievod entered the Muntenian land with all his troops to the place Rătezat, near the hillock Căiata, on that side of the Râmnic; and there arrived an emissary from Radu Voievod [...] who pleaded with Prince (Voievod) Bogdan to make peace with Radu Voievod, because 'you are Christians and from the same people' (said he); and many words were exchanged between them and much pleading [...] and Bogdan Voievod, after much pleading, gave in and made peace". Lecca's painting shows the two domnitori (rulers) shaking hands in the center. The flags of Moldavia (blue-red) and of Wallachia (yellow-blue) can also be seen, although these color combinations have not been attested prior to 1832–34.

P. V. Năsturel contests this legend, noting that the red-yellow-blue tricolor predated the union of the principalities and that the three colors, arrayed vertically, represent the flag of the Romanian nation in all lands inhabited by Romanians.

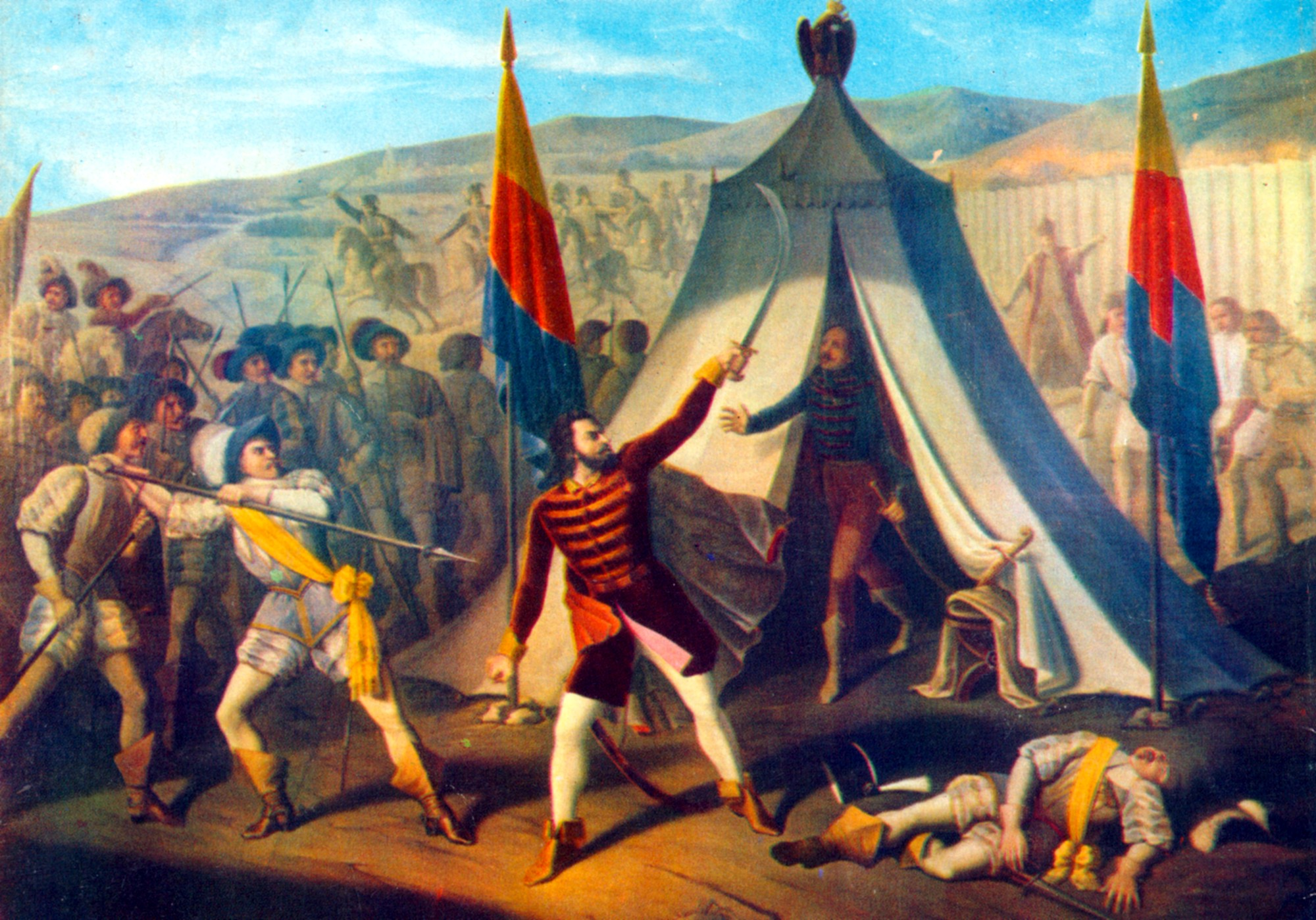
Constantin Lecca – The Killing of Michael the Brave

In 1848, the tricolor was present in Focșani and Râmnicu Sărat (on opposite sides of the principalities' border) during demonstrations of fraternity held by Moldavians and Wallachians, while in 1857, around the time of the Moldavian Ad hoc Divan, the civilian population adopted the tricolor as a symbol of union, a fact observed by Count Alexandre Walewski, French foreign minister.

Also that year, the minister of foreign affairs of the Wallachian provisional government assured the extraordinary envoy of the Porte, Suleiman Pasha, that the flag's three colors had existed "for a long time; our ancestors bore them on their standard and their flags. So they are not a borrowing or an imitation from the present or a threat for the future".

Another of Lecca's paintings shows the assassination of Michael the Brave in 1601. Also depicted is the united standard of the three provinces, with yellow on top (Wallachia), red in the middle (Moldavia) and blue below (Transylvania). This hypothesis of the three colors' union has appeared in historical literature, also engendering skepticism regarding the arguments deployed in its favor.

== Flags of the United Principalities ==
Flag of the United Principalities; design used from 1862

On 6 February 1859, on his first journey to Bucharest since being elected domnitor of Wallachia, Alexandru Ioan Cuza was greeted at the edge of the city of Buzău by the commander of the dorobanți, who was carrying a tricolor flag. The sight deeply moved Cuza.

Until 1861 the old flags of Moldavia and Wallachia were used alongside the tricolor. On 22 June of that year, Cuza decreed the tricolor as the United Principalities' official civil flag.

The flag was the red-yellow-blue Romanian tricolor, with horizontal stripes. Neither the order of stripes nor the proportion of the civil flag are known. This is first described in Almanahul român din 1866: "the tricolor flag, divided in three stripes, red, yellow and blue and laid out horizontally: red above, blue below and yellow in the middle". Some sources suggest that the top stripe was blue until 1862 (as in the revolutionary Wallachian tricolor of 1848), replaced that year by red. An approximate ratio of 1:3 has been suggested, although the princely and army flags, both preserved, had a 2:3 proportion. As for symbolism, P. V. Năsturel asserts that "from 1859 to 1866 it represented just what it had done in 1848: liberty, justice, fraternity".

The flag gained a degree of international recognition. Relating prince Cuza's May–June 1864 journey to Constantinople, doctor Carol Davila observed: "The Romanian flag was raised on the great mast, the Sultan's kayaks awaited us, the guard was armed, the Grand Vizier at the door... The Prince, quiet, dignified, concise in his speech, spent 20 minutes with the Sultan, who then came to review us... Once again, the Grand Vizier led the Prince to the main gate and we returned to the Europe Palace, the Romanian flag still fluttering on the mast...”

=== Princely flag ===
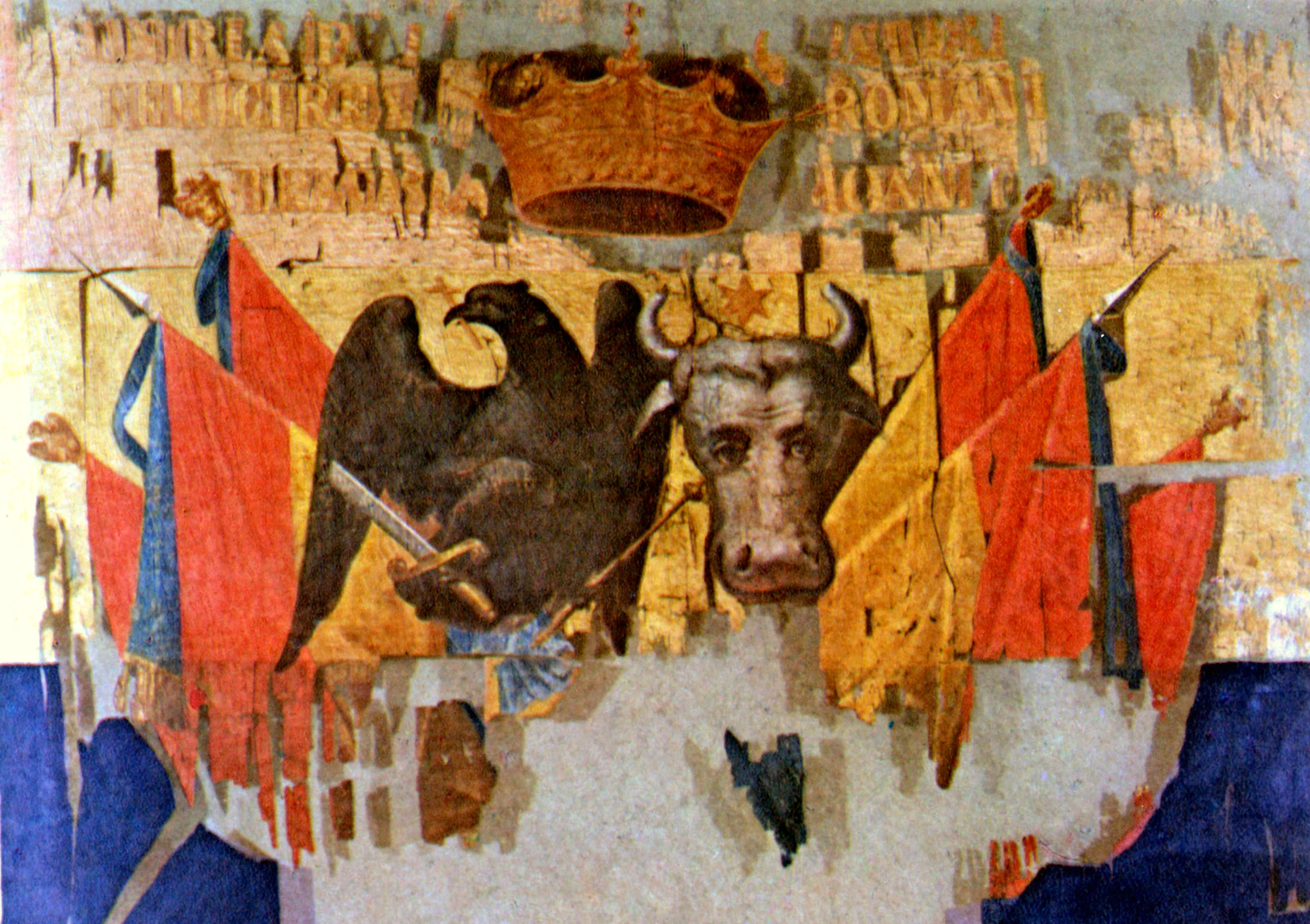
Princely flag of Alexandru Ioan Cuza.

A rather worn tricolor is found today in the collections of the National Museum of Romanian History, with inventory number 75045. Rectangular in shape (with a 2:3 ratio), it is made up of three silk strips laid out horizontally (with red on top). In the center-right of the flag is painted the Wallachian eagle, a cross in its beak and clutching the symbols of princely power, while the Moldavian aurochs appears on the center-left, a six-pointed star between its horns. Six inclined tricolor flags surround the two symbols (three on the left and three on the right); their flagpoles probably crossed near the bottom, which is now lost. Each flag has a blue ribbon above it and at the tips of their flagpoles are found, one on each side, a Wallachian eagle, the edge of a lance and a Moldavian aurochs. On the red strip are found stitched a princely crown, situated in the center so as to mark the two coats of arms, and the statement "UNIREA PRINCIPATELOR – FERICIREA ROMÂNILOR. TRĂIASCĂ A. IOAN I!” ("The Union of the Principalities – the joy of Romanians. Long Live A. Ioan I!”) on both sides of the crown and now partially faded. The flagpole ends in a metal sphere topped by an eagle.

Researchers differ on the origin and date of this flag. Col. Dr. Alexandru Vasile and Dr. Maria Ioniţă consider that this was the United Principalities' official flag. The latter dates it to 1859, the period immediately after the Union, as does Dan Cernovodeanu. Mario to believes it was a military colors used between 1859 and 1861.

Elena Pălănceanu and Cornelia Apostol believe it was a princely flag designed in 1862, after the full union of the two entities, proclaimed on 11/24 December 1861. Indeed, Cuza only adopted the title "Alexandru Ion I" after this date.

After Cuza's abdication, the flag was kept at the Bucharest Army Arsenal until 1919, when it was transferred to the National Military Museum. It has been at its present location since 1971.

It seems that this specimen was preceded by another, dating to 1859, featuring a tricolor canvas with somewhat smaller dimensions. In this flag, the blue strip is on top, while the two principalities' coats of arms are no longer surrounded by flags. Today the inscription on the blue strip is illegible, but differed from that found on the other flag.

Another princely flag, rather different from contemporary designs, is a silk tricolor with vertical stripes (blue hoist) and a princely crown painted in the center. It was raised whenever the domnitor was present at Ruginoasa Castle. Today it is found at the Suceava History Museum, part of the Bukovina Museum Complex.

=== Military colors ===
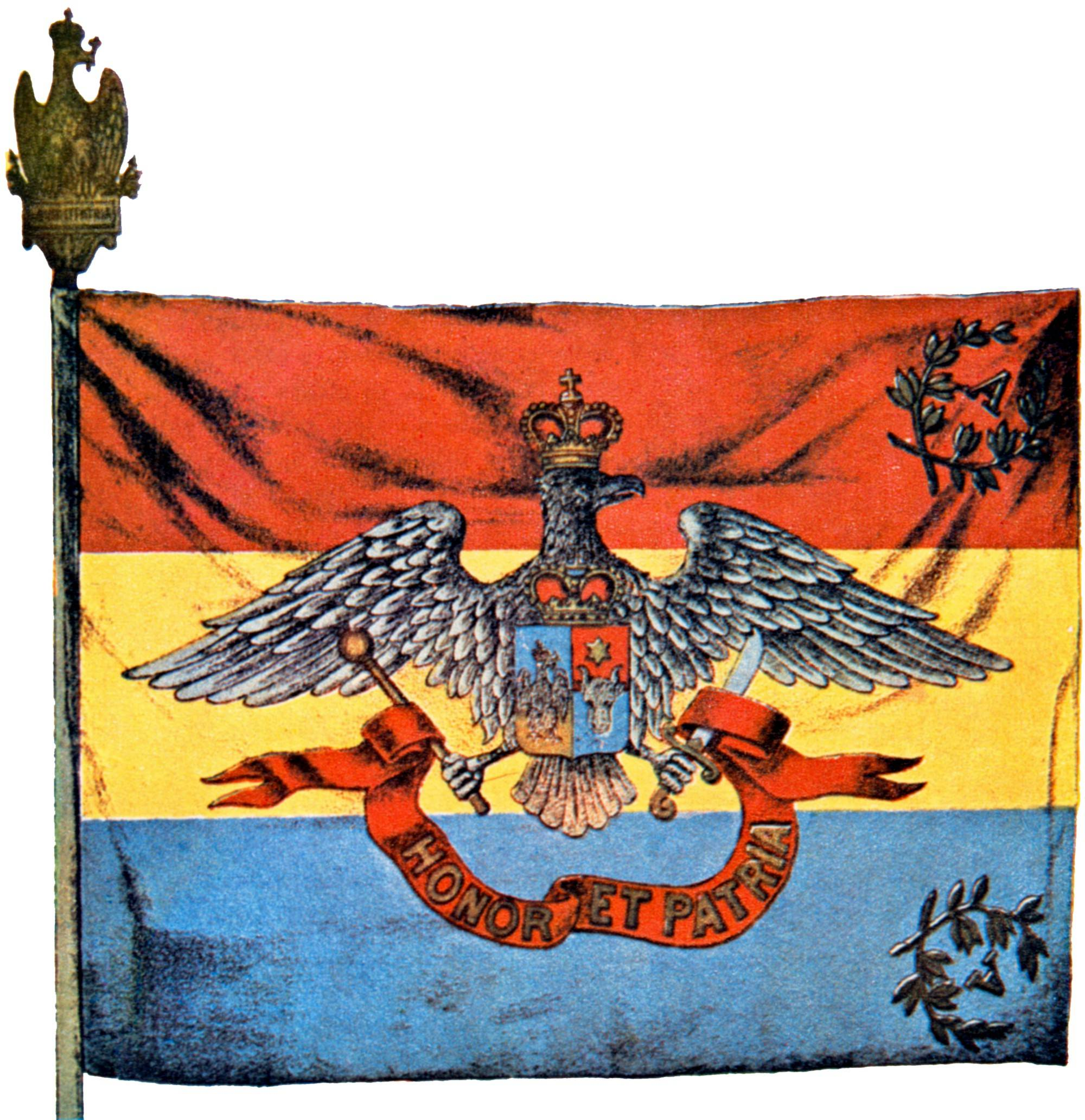
1863 military colors

Article 45 of the Paris Convention (1858) provided that "the armies of both countries will keep their present flags; but these flags will feature, in the future, a blue banderole, in conformity with the design attached to the present Convention".

On 18 March 1863, the War Minister, General Ioan Emanoil Florescu, asked Cuza to approve a design for army flags, agreed upon by the government in its session of 12 March. The flags featured the national tricolor (horizontal stripes, with red on top), over which was a Roman eagle with a cross in its beak. In a solemn order of the day on 19 March, Cuza decided: "Considering that the army, following the union, should have but one flag; keeping in mind that the true emblem of Romania can only be the Roman eagle, [...] we have decreed and do decree what follows: the Roman eagle with cross in its mouth shall be placed, as the emblem of Romania, above the army's flags [...]"

The resulting designs, distributed on 1 September 1863, differ somewhat from those legislated in March. This, the Roman eagle, wings outstretched, wearing the princely crown, carries the princely scepter in its right talon and the sword in its left; on its breast appears an open shield topped by the princely crown. On the left of the shield, over azure and gold, is the Wallachian eagle (a cross in its beak, in left profile and wearing the princely crown); on the right, over red and azure, is the Moldavian aurochs with a star between its horns. Hanging from the scepter and sword is a red ribbon with gold-embossed letters: "HONOR ET PATRIA" ("honor and Fatherland"). In the fly corners the princely cipher is stitched, surrounded by a laurel wreath; all are golden. Each flag also had inscribed in gold the name of the unit that bore it. The cloth part was 122 centimeter long and 100 centimeter wide. A metal Roman eagle was affixed to the tip of the flagpole. Although the order of 19 March had the Moldavian symbol in the right, nevertheless the first on the shield is the Wallachian eagle. The design was most likely adopted due to customary usage that arose after Bucharest became the single capital in February 1862.

These flags were distributed to the following units:

- 1st Infantry Regiment
- 2nd Infantry Regiment
- 3rd Infantry Regiment
- 4th Infantry Regiment
- 5th Infantry Regiment
- 6th Infantry Regiment
- 7th Infantry Regiment
- 1st Lancers' Regiment
- 2nd Lancers' Regiment
- 1st Artillery Regiment
- 1st Rifle Battalion
- 1st Military engineers' Battalion
- 1st Firefighters' Battalion
- 1st Border Guards' Legion, Danube line
- 2nd Border Guards' Legion, Mountain line
- 1st Dorobanţi Legion
- 2nd Dorobanţi Legion

With the occasion of handing over the flags, Cuza delivered the following speech:

Officers, subofficers, corporals, and soldiers, this day will be one of the most significant in our history. The old flags brought sad memories, as they flew over divided Nations. Today, you receive from Our hands the flag that unites the colors of the Sister-Nations, just as the unanimous will of Romanians has united on Our head the crowns of both Nations. Nevertheless, your flags were witnesses of events that seek to be preserved: they shall decorate the Romanian arsenal. Receiving these new flags, always remember that I entrust to you the honor of the Nation. The flag is Romania! this blessed earth of the Fatherland, sprinkled with the blood of our forefathers and endowed with the worker's sweat. It is the family, the garden of each one, the house in which your parents were born and where your children will be born. The flag too is the symbol of the devotion, faith, order and discipline represented by the army! The flag is, at the same time, the past, present and future of the Nation: the entire history of Romania! In a word: the flag represents all the duties and all the military virtues encompassed in the two words carved into the Roman vultures, honor and Fatherland!

Officers, junior officers, corporals, and soldiers, swear to keep your flags with honor and without stain, and thus will you match the trust and expectations that we have placed in the army along with the entire Nation! Swear to defend them in any circumstance as a sacred deposit that I entrust to your bravery and patriotism!

Long live Romania!

These flags were used until 1866 when, after Cuza's abdication, they were changed. Four army flags of the 1863 design are preserved today.

== Romanian flags until 1918 ==
Flag of Romania (1867–1948)

Article 124 of the 1866 Constitution of Romania provided that "the colors of the United Principalities will be Blue, Yellow and Red". The order and placement of the colors were decided by the Assembly of Deputies in its session of 26 March 1867. Thus, following a proposal by Nicolae Golescu, they were placed just as in 1848. The commission's work continued on 30 March as well; following an affirmative vote by the Senate, these wrapped up with the adoption, on 12/24 April 1867, of the "Law for fixing the arms of Romania".

According to this, the flag's colors had to be placed vertically in the following order: blue hoist, yellow in the middle and red fly. The country's coat of arms was placed only on army and princely flags, in the center; civilian flags remained without a coat of arms. The same distinction was made between flags for the naval war fleet and the civilian fleet.

The rapporteur Mihail Kogălniceanu, who also conveyed the opinion of Cezar Bolliac, Dimitrie Brătianu, Constantin Grigorescu, Ion Leca, Nicolae Golescu and Gheorghe Grigore Cantacuzino, said: "The tricolor flag as it is today is not (as the minister claims) the flag of the Union of the principalities. It is much more: it is itself the flag of the Romanian nation in all lands inhabited by Romanians".

The "Law for modifying the country's arms" of 11/23 March 1872 did not change these provisions, only the design of the coat of arms. The design proposed by Ștefan Dimitrie Grecianu was adopted.

=== Princely and royal standard ===
According to the laws of 1867 and 1872, the princely (later royal) standard was identical to that of the army, with the country's coat of arms in the center.

Nevertheless, when these were produced a slightly different design was adopted: the yellow stripe was twice as wide as the red and blue ones, and the canvas had a 1:1 ratio. Each corner of the flag had sewn into it a silver royal crown. The crown prince's standard was identical except that it lacked the crowns in the corners.

An album dating to the end of the 19th century and the October 1917 National Geographic Magazine show the flags as having stripe ratios of 1:3:1.

King's standard

Crown Prince's standard

=== Military colors ===
Military colors, 1866 design

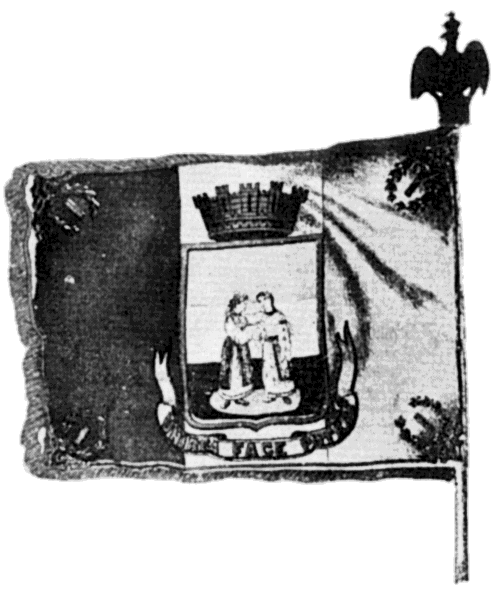
Focșani Civic Guard flag

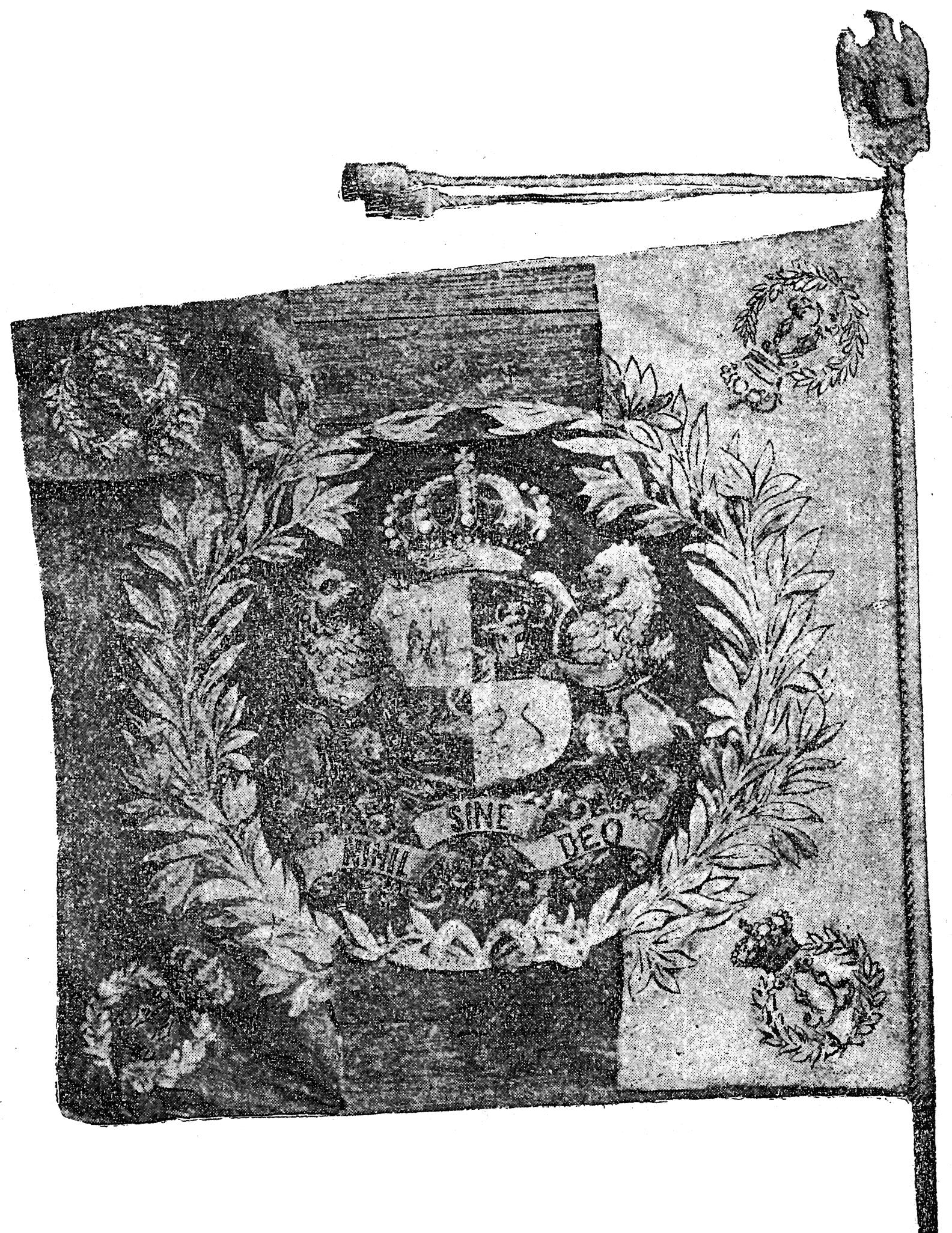
Military colors, 1882 design. color detail here and [https://www.flickr.com/photos/90756383@N00/257242230/ here

Right after Alexander John Cuza's abdication, the military units' military colors were replaced with a new 1866 design; instead of the coat of arms, the name of the company appeared on the standards. However, the eagle at the edge of the flagpole was preserved.

The flags distributed to the Civic Guard, re-established in March 1866, had a different design—the colors were vertical, in the center was found the respective city's coat of arms and not the national one, and the eagle at the end of the lance was larger and featured the shield of the United Principalities on its breast. P. V. Năsturel classifies these as 1867 design flags and describes them in detail: the canvas was 114 centimeter long and 95 centimeter wide (so a 5:6 ratio) and in the center was painted the respective city's coat of arms, covered with a golden mural crown. In the corners, surrounded by laurel wreaths, the number of the legion was stitched in Roman numerals. Golden fringes surrounded the canvas, with tassels from the same fabric hanging at the corners. The eagle at the end of the flagpole had its wings facing downward, had the princely crown on its head and carried a sceptre in its right hand and a sword in its left; all were made of gold. A shield was carved into the eagle's breast, with the Wallachian eagle in the first half and the Moldavian aurochs' head in the second. Above the sword and sceptre a ribbon passed bearing the inscription "Honor et Patria". On 11 September 1867, Prince Carol I solemnly handed over these flags to the Civic Guards.

In 1873 it was decided that the 1866 design military flags would be replaced with the 1872 design, following the Law for the modification of the national coat of arms of 1872. Design-wise, these fall into several generations.

Flags produced in 1873 (24 flags and 10 standards), of which only one, the Firemen's, survived in 1900, were square, 150 centimeter on each side. In its center was painted, on a maroon background surrounded by a closed wreath of silver laurels, Romania's middle coat of arms. The monogram of Prince Carol was in the corners, surrounded by a laurel crown, while the flagpole was topped by a metal eagle with the motto "Onóre și Patria" ("honor and Fatherland") as well as the unit's number and name. The cavalry flags had canvases of reduced dimensions (45 centimeter), while the decorative elements were embroidered and not painted. All these insignia were distributed to the units on 14 October 1874, on the field at Băneasa.

Flags produced between 1877 and 1882 differ slightly from the preceding ones. On 17 July 1877, just ten units created after 1874 received this design, at the Poiana army headquarters. On this occasion, Prince Carol addressed the following words to his troops: "In giving you the corps' flag, I entrust the honor of Romania, which I thus place under the shield of courage, to your devotion and self-denial. For the first time the solemn occasion arises where you receive the flag on the day before going onto the field of honor; seek to crown it with an undying glory. Never forget that the flag is the symbol of the fatherland..."

These two categories of flags were replaced with new ones in 1902, on the 25th anniversary of the Romanian War of Independence.

Small details differentiate flags produced between 1882 and 1897 from their predecessors. The canvas was square, 156 centimeter to a side; a ribbon of tricolored thread ending in tassels was attached to the flagpole. The lions holding up the coat of arms had gold teeth and claws this time, while the coat of arms was no longer bordered in maroon. In the middle of the shield, the coat of arms of the House of Hohenzollern was surrounded by a gold border.

These three generations were realized by the Romanian state at Berlin's Collani et Comp house. In 1896, war minister Anton Berindei, observing that "the way in which [the flags] are woven and the materials used leave something to be desired, as their canvas gets cut and breaks", addressed an order to General Ioan Argetoianu, president of the joint commission and inspector general of the military engineers: "I have the honor of asking you to take measures so that the commission over which you preside can make a detailed description of the flags and standards in existence, on the materials from which they must be produced, dimensions, etc. In the work to be done the law of 8 March 1872 [...] which decided the national insignia and flag, will be kept in mind".

Thus, beginning with the 1897 design flags, the ratio was 2:3, the entire national coat of arms appeared in the center (with modifications made after 1881), and the wreath that surrounded it was sometimes open.

Most of the flags belonging to divisions that took part in World War I were handed to them in 1902 or in 1908–1916, and were used until 1929 when they were transferred to the Military Museum. These are similar to the 1897 design, although after King Carol died on 10 October 1914, King Ferdinand's monogram began appearing in the corners. Their dimensions vary from 90 × 65 centimeter to 115 × 73 centimeter.

Along with the military colors, through High decrees nr. 355 of February 1871 and nr. 1467 of 21 August 1873, designs for stakes were defined for each infantry corps, as well as battalion pennants. The latter substituted for military colors where necessary (each regiment had just a single flag), and were vertical tricolors, as provided by the 1867 and 1872 laws regarding Romania's coats of arms.

A flag was also established for Romania's Coast Guard. According to the October 1917 National Geographic, this was identical to the national flag, except that the yellow stripe featured a blue anchor and cable, above which was a silver royal crown.

==== Colour guard regulations ====
Also in this period there appeared laws and regulations providing how the military colors should be used, guarded and saluted. Thus, High decree nr. 1451 of 18 August 1873 specified that the flag should be carried by the regiment's adjutant junior officer who was also the ensign, aided by the assistant officer. Likewise, the composition of the colour guard of infantry units was regulated. This was composed of five sergeants, of whom two in the first row, flanking the adjutant junior officer and having the assistant officer on the right, and three in the second row, behind the first. The assistant officer serves as commander of the colour guard. The "Regulation concerning infantry exercises and maneuvers" provided that during military maneuvers the flag (or guidon/fanion) should be in the center of the second battalion if the regiment was composed of three battalions or in the center of the first battalion if the regiment had only two. The regimental ensign, chosen by the colonel of the unit, was not integrated into any subdivision of the battalion. The same regulation listed in its index the honors due to the flag, as well as the manner of saluting with the flag in ceremonies, with the specification that this was reserved for the princely family.

1897 design military colors, with King Carol I's monogram

1914 design military colors, with King Ferdinand I's monogram.

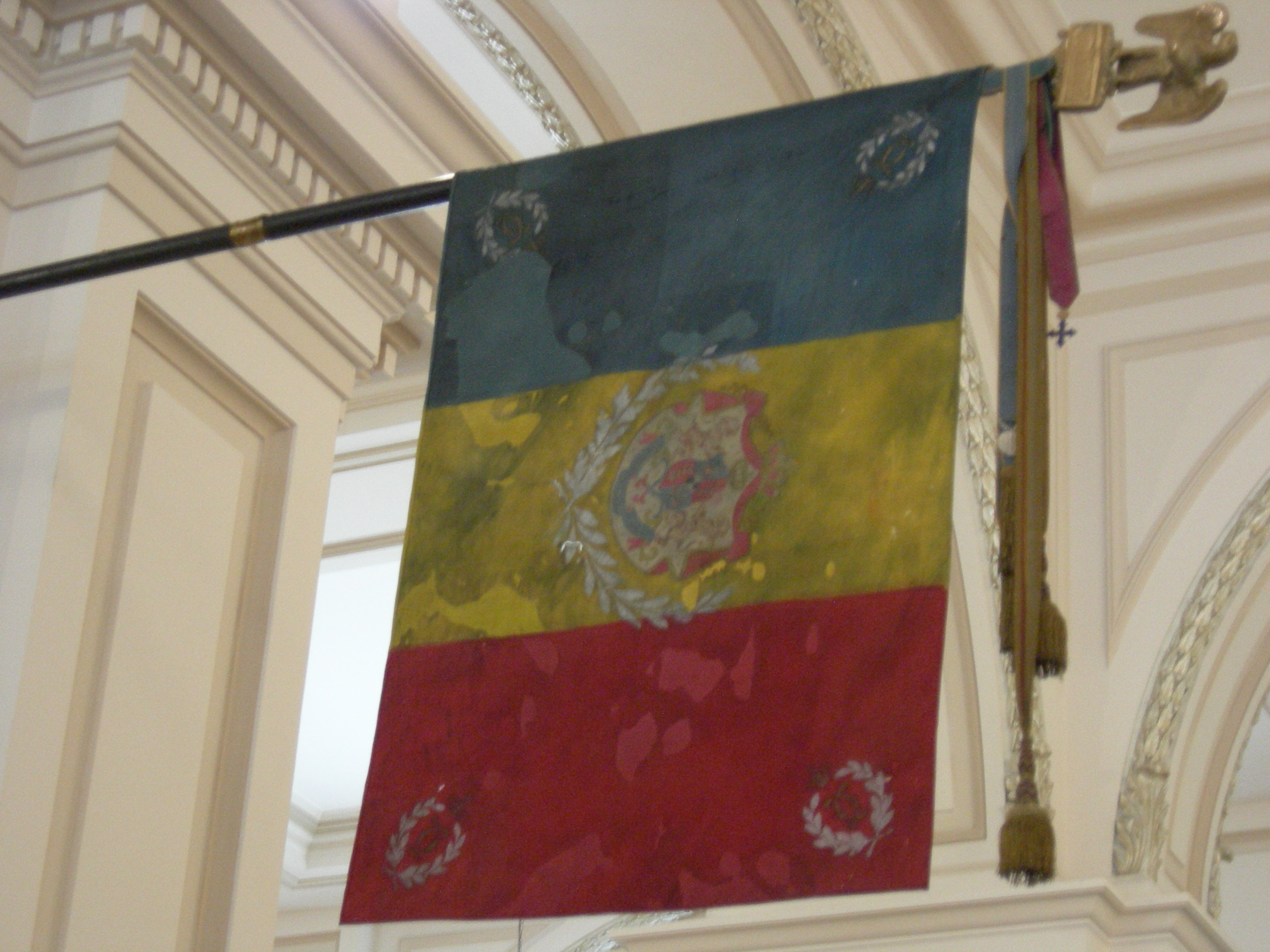
1902 design military colors, kept at MNIR

Coast Guard flag

=== Romanian flags in Transylvania, Banat, Bukovina and Bessarabia ===
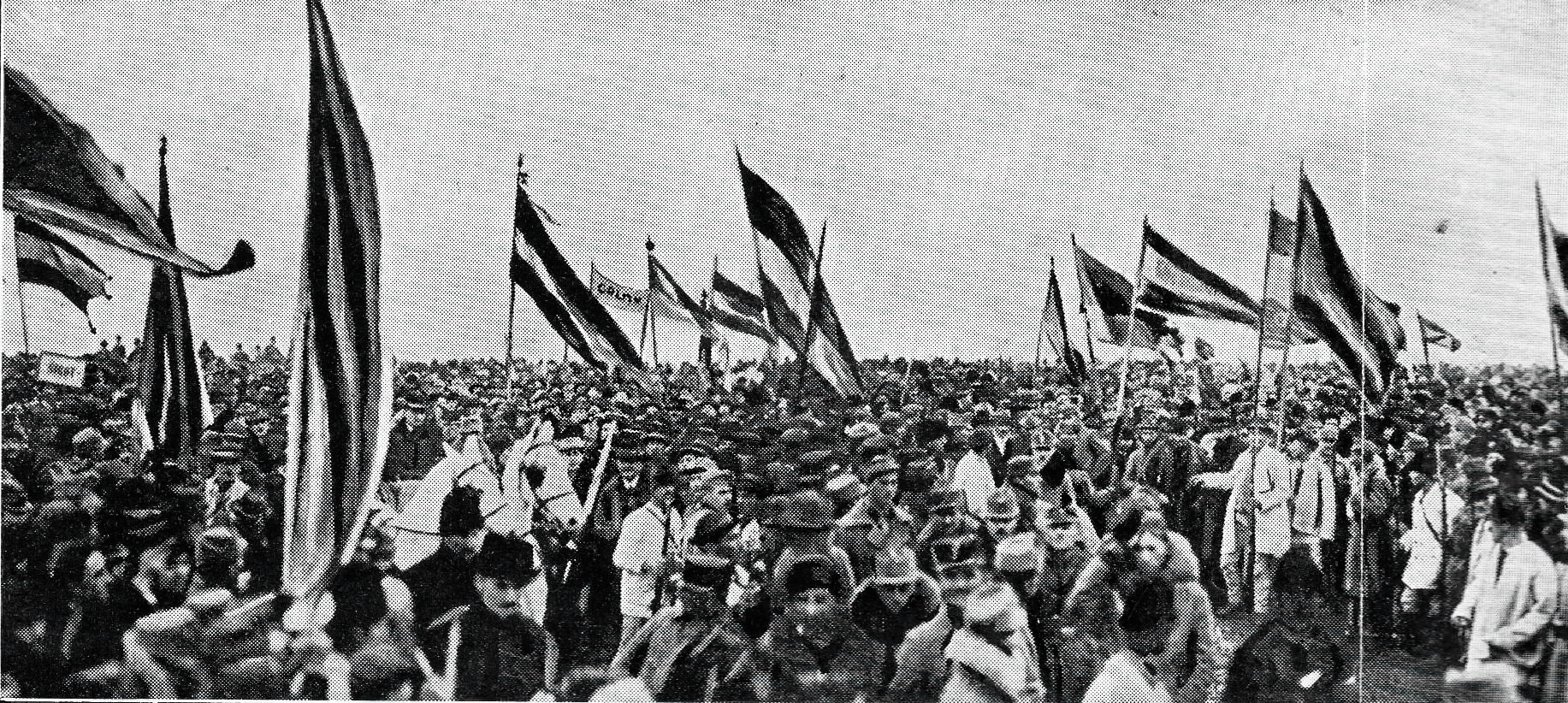
View of the Great National Assembly of Alba Iulia

Transylvania, Banat, Bukovina and Bessarabia were provinces of the Austro-Hungarian and Russian empires with substantial Romanian populations. In 1918, the year they joined Romania, favorable conditions arose for the Romanians there to express openly their desire to unite with the "Motherland".

In Bessarabia, the Moldavian Democratic Republic was created on 2 December 1917 and declared independence on 24 January 1918. In May 1917, the heraldist Paul Gore had written a Russian-language study, "The National colors of the Romanians in Bessarabia", which sought to demonstrate that Bessarabians should use the Romanian tricolor correctly: "A certain esteem for the national past and just a little courage are needed to defend your national legal rights. In no way do I insist that our national flag composed of three stripes colored blue, yellow and red have these stripes arranged vertically. Let these stripes, in the order indicated, be horizontal. But the colors and their order we must preserve, especially because all three of these colors are also in the Coat of Arms of Bessarabia, which represents, if we eliminate the border made up of the Imperial colors, precisely the ancient coat of arms of the Moldavian Principality, and it is known that flags must be designed according to the exact rules of heraldry, according to the colors of the field and the emblems of the corresponding coats of arms".

With this perspective in mind, the heraldist Silviu Andrieș-Tabac considers Gore the moral author of the flag of the Moldavian Democratic Republic. This was a blue-yellow-red tricolor with horizontal stripes and the coat of arms in the center of the yellow field and the inscription "Republica Democratică Moldovenească și Independentă" ("The Moldavian and Independent Democratic Republic") in the center of the blue field. The flag of Sfatul Țării was similar, except that "Sfatul Țării" was written on the blue field and the coat of arms, with larger dimensions, was placed in the middle, over yellow and red.

The republic's military colors were fashioned "several weeks before 6 December [1917], when the parade of Moldavian troops from Bessarabia took place". These were also tricolors; on one side was written the regiment's number in silver thread, and on the other, stretching all across the flag, the letters "R M".

In Transylvania, many Romanian flags were produced in anticipation of the Great National Assembly of Alba Iulia at Alba Iulia. These were horizontal blue-yellow-red tricolors, echoing the 1848 revolution. The images on glass captured at the Assembly by photographer Samoilă Mârza show a massive throng above whom flutter numerous such flags, some of the canvases inscribed with a motto.

The National Museum of Romanian History holds three flags from Assembly participants and the coat of arms of a fourth, which belonged to the Alba Iulia national guard. The first tricolor has dimensions of 235 × 100 centimeter, and each of its stripes ends on the fly in a corner with the tip turned outside. The wooden flagpole is painted black. On second tricolor, 130 × 75 centimeter, just the yellow and red stripes survive, and both end in a corner with the tip on the outside. The third flag is woolen and 190 × 120 centimeter. Its colored stripes all end in a sharp angle with the tip outside; to each one is sewn a tassel in the respective color. A tricolor ribbon with a tassel on either end is attached to the flagpole.

Banner of the Moldavian Democratic Republic

Banner of Sfatul Țării

Military colors of the Moldavian Democratic Republic

One of the flag designs seen at Alba Iulia in December 1918.

== Flags of Greater Romania ==
After Greater Romania came into being, the tricolor remained the official flag, with stripes arranged vertically and without a coat of arms in the center.

=== Royal standards ===
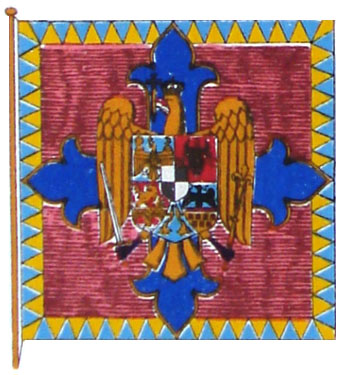
King's standard, Carol II design

On 24 April 1922 new designs for royal standards were adopted.

The king's standard consisted of a red-maroon square flag, bordered by a yellow strip with blue triangles. There were thirteen blue triangles to a side, with an additional four in the corners. The country's lesser coat of arms was found in the middle of the flag; beneath it was placed the cross of the Order of Michael the Brave. After ascending the throne in 1930, King Carol II stretched the cross to the edge of the standard, "as a symbol of heroic royalty", and placed the lesser coat of arms above it. When his remains were returned to Romania in 2003, his coffin was draped in this standard.

The queen's standard was similar to the king's, but the cross was missing. The crown prince's standard was dark blue, with a red border and yellow triangles; the lesser coat of arms was in the center. The royal princes' flag was similar but lacked a border. In 1940, when Queen Helen returned to Romania, a flag was designed for the queen mother. This was similar to the queen's standard but also lacked a border.

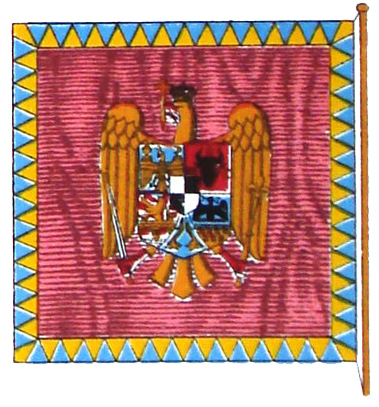
Queen's standard

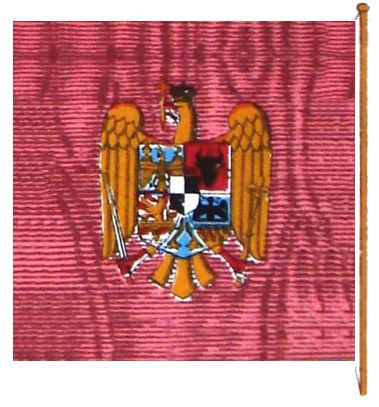
Queen Mother's standard

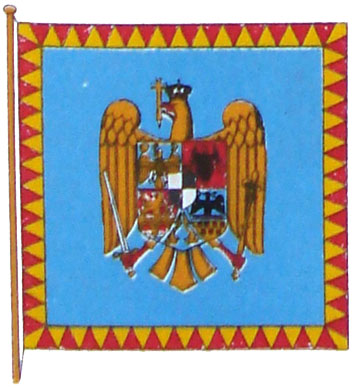
Crown Prince's standard

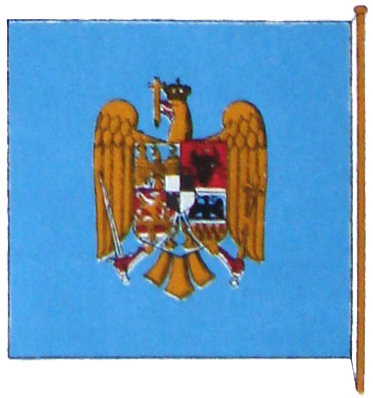
Royal princes' standard

=== Flags and standards of public officials ===
Contemporary vexillological albums (for instance the 1939 edition of Flaggenbuch) display a number of flags and standards of interwar Romanian public officials. The war minister's flag was a tricolor square with the letter "M" in white found on the blue stripe. The other ministers had similar flags but without the "M". The jack employed by Romanian vessels was a yellow square bordered red with the coat of arms in the center. The ship captains' standard was the national flag with a royal crown in the center. Pilot boats’ standard consisted of a national flag bordered in white. The flag's ratio was 3:6 and the thickness of the border 2; altogether, it had a 10:13 ratio. River police had as their standard a blue square with a white "P" in the center. The standard of the postal division of the Romanian Maritime Service had a white field (ratio 4:5), with the fly ending in a sharp interior angle. A square national flag with the royal crown in the center appeared in the canton. A blue cord hung from the tricolor, catching a golden postal horn.

Standard of Marshall Ion Antonescu

War Minister's flag

Other ministers' flag

Navy jack

Standard of a commercial ship's captain

Standard of pilot boats

River police standard

Postal standard of the S.M.R.

=== Military colors ===
Military flags were tricolors with the national coat of arms painted in the center. In the corners were found the golden monograms of Kings Ferdinand I, Carol II or Michael I (two designs), crowned and surrounded by a wreath of golden oak leaves. The flagpoles ended in a metal eagle with wings facing downward, crowned and carrying a cross in its beak. All were without any fringe.

Ferdinand I design

Carol II design

Michael I design
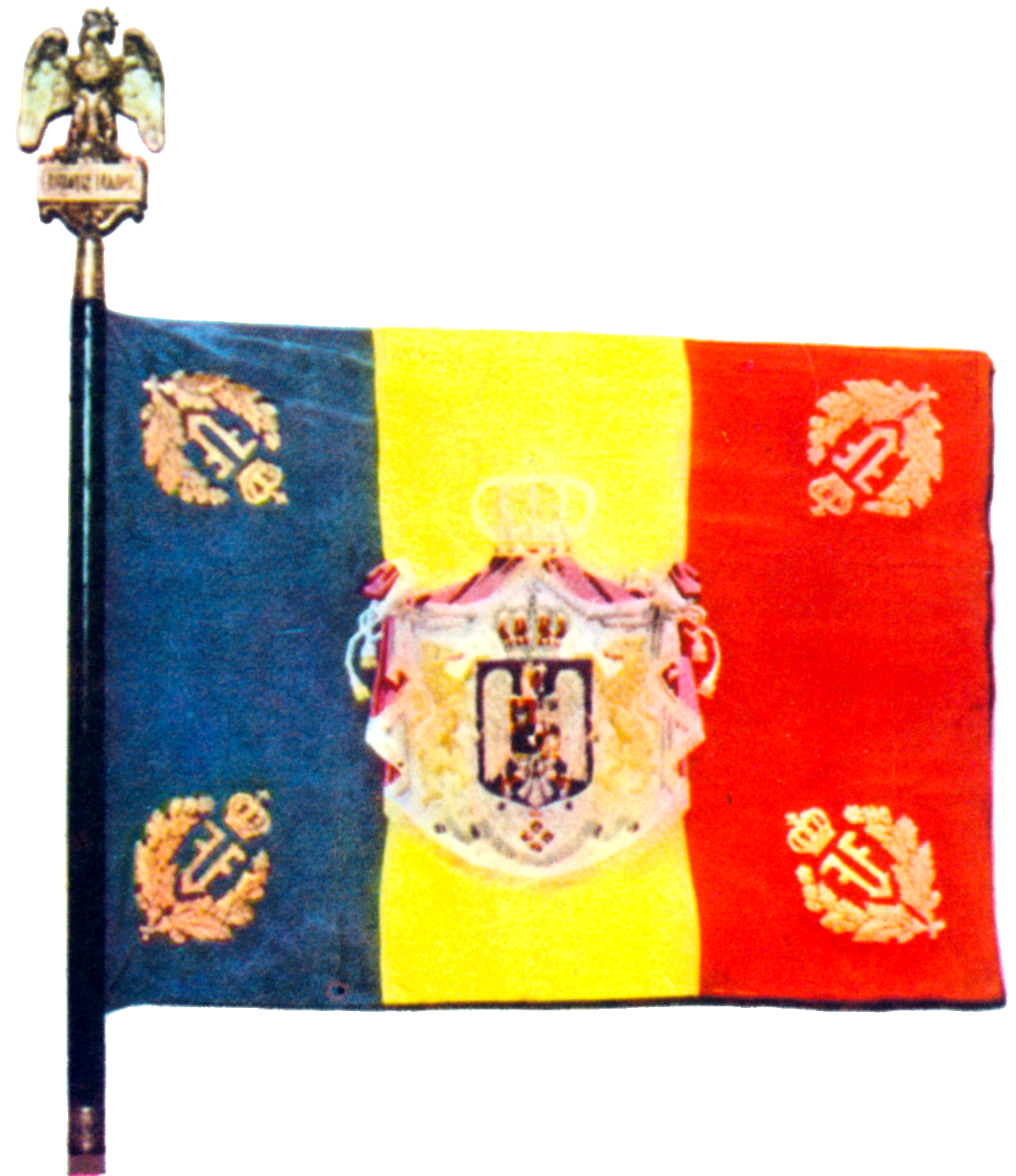
Ferdinand I design during World War II

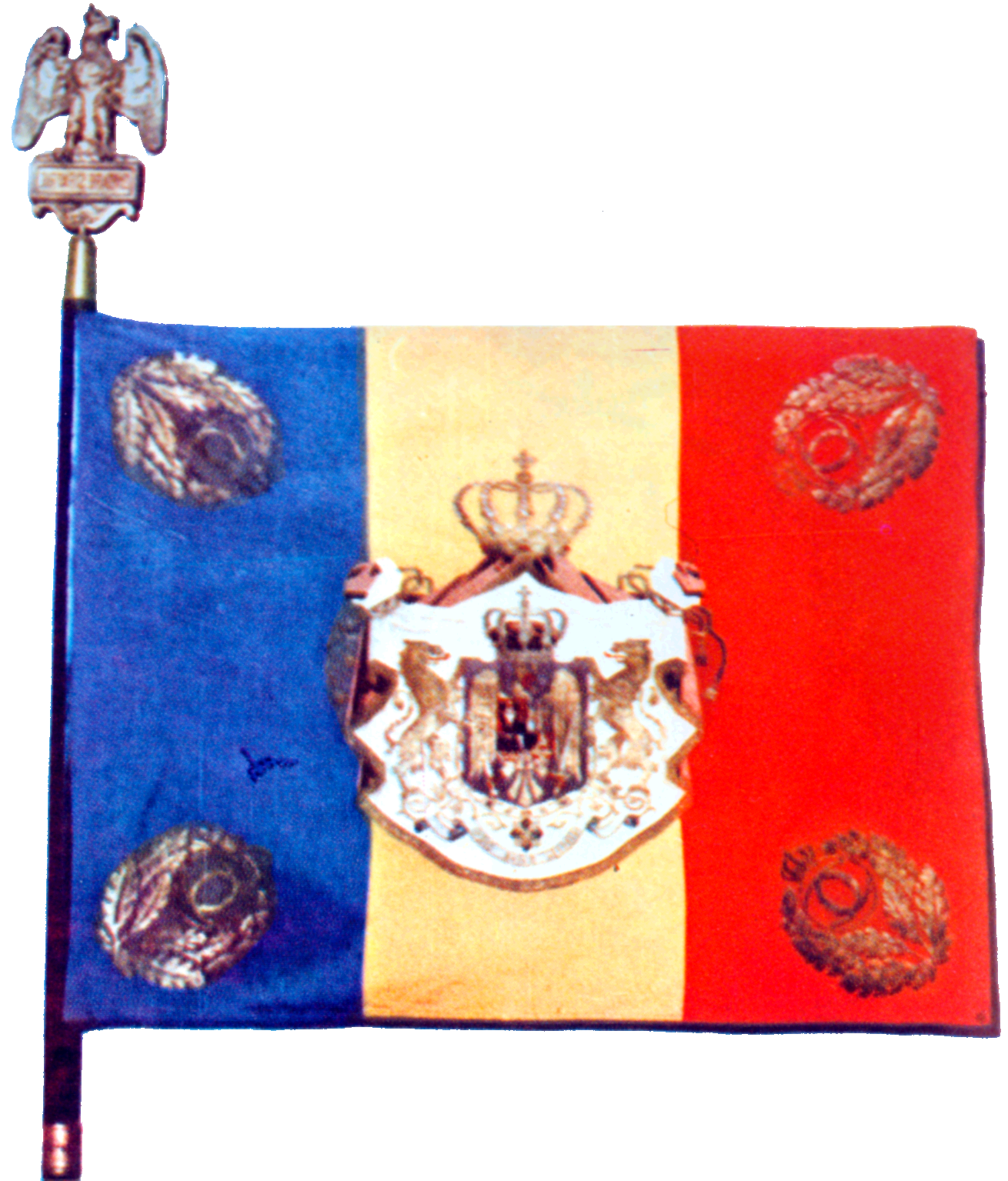
Carol II design during World War II

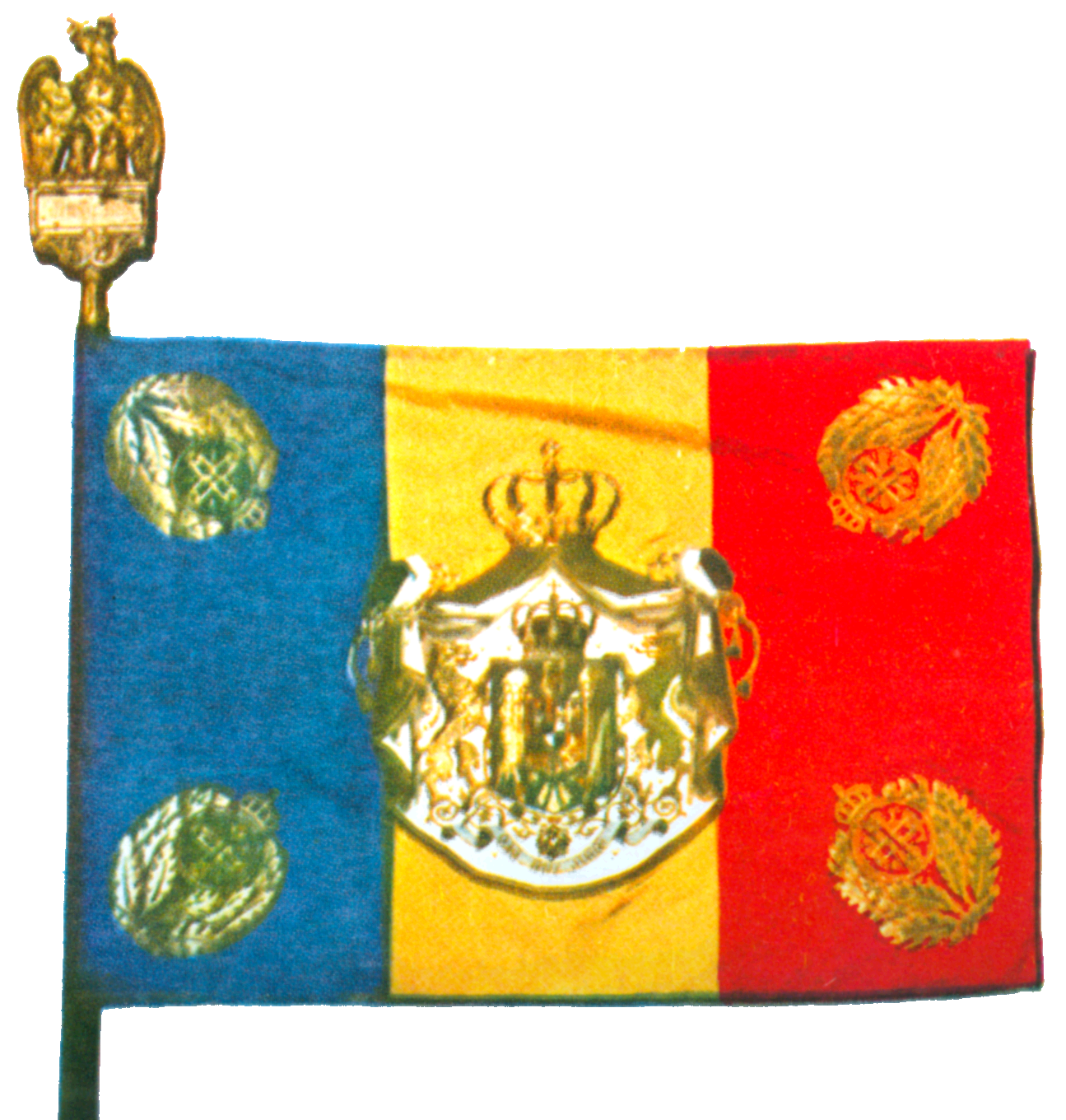
Michael I design during World War II

=== Naval flags ===
Admirals' flags (including vice- and rear admirals'), shown in the 1939 Flaggenbuch, were square Romanian tricolors. The Chief of the Naval General Staff had two white stars on the blue stripe of his flag and two crossed anchors; the three elements were one beneath the other. The vice admiral's flag did not have the anchors, while the rear admiral's standard had just one star on the blue stripe.

Naval captains and commanders had a longer red stripe on their standard, ending in an angle pointing inward; the ratio was about 11:13. Deputy commanders of ships had a tricolored triangle for their emblem, in a 2:3 ratio.

Vice Admiral of the Navy

Vice Admiral

Rear Admiral

Commodore and Captain-Commodore

Lieutenant-Commodore

=== Naval flags of World War II ===
Shortly before World War II, the flags of military vessels were changed. A specific design was adopted, the yellow portion taking the form of a cross with widened arms. The following models are shown in Flaggenbuch, 1939:

Navy Minister and Air Transport Minister

Undersecretary of State at the Navy Ministry

Vice Admiral Navy Commander

Rear Admiral Navy Commander

Rear Admiral

Chief Commodore of a flotilla

Chief Commodore of a small unit

Group Commander

Officials

Naval pennant

== Communist Romania ==
On 30 December 1947, Romania was proclaimed a people's republic and all the kingdom's symbols were outlawed, including the coats of arms and the tricolor flags that showed them. On 8 January 1948, Decree nr. 3 was issued, regarding specifications for the powers of the Presidium of the Romanian People's Republic. At article 7, this provided that the republic's new coat of arms should be "composed of: a tractor, a group of three chimneys against the field of a rising sun, surrounded by bound ears of wheat, tied by a ribbon with the inscription Republica Populară Română and the initials R. P. R. at the end of the ears". Article 8 dealt with the national flag: "the colors of the Romanian People's Republic are: blue, yellow and red, arranged vertically, and having in the center of the yellow field the Coat of Arms of the Republic".

According to article 101 of the 1948 Constitution, "The flag of the Romanian People's Republic is composed of the colors: blue, yellow and red, arranged vertically. In the middle is placed the national coat of arms". The 1952 Constitution, at article 103, added a little detail: "The flag of the Romanian People's Republic has the colors red, yellow and blue, arranged vertically with blue near the lance. In the middle is placed the coat of arms of the Romanian People's Republic". Neither the colors' shades nor the flag's proportions were specified. According to provisions of the 1952 Constitution, a five-pointed red star appeared at the upper edge of the coat of arms (itself altered in March 1948), something that was also reflected on flags and official Romanian standards.

The Constitution of the Socialist Republic of Romania, adopted in 1965, provided the following in article 118: "The flag of the Socialist Republic of Romania has the colors red, yellow and blue, arranged vertically, with blue near the flagpole. The coat of arms of the Socialist Republic of Romania is affixed to the middle".

Decree nr. 972 of 5 November 1968 regarding the insignia of the Socialist Republic of Romania (RSR) described in detail the coat of arms, seal, flag and state anthem of the republic. The attached commentary noted that, in the absence of corresponding regulations, "there have appeared mistaken interpretations of these [constitutional specifications], incorrect or diverging usages of the state insignia". Chapter IV of the decree is entirely devoted to describing the flag and the protocol for its use. Thus, the flag is defined as having a ratio of 2:3, with the colored stripes of equal dimensions. The regular colors were printed in the annex and not expressly named. The coat of arms was placed in the center; its height was 2/5 the flag's width. As before, it was provided that the flag's proportions could differ for ornamental purposes, but the coat of arms must always be in the center, vertical. Articles 13–21 specifically and exhaustively covered flag protocol, describing where it was to be raised permanently and temporarily (art. 13), the protocol for raising it outside the country's borders (art. 14) and during demonstrations by socialist organizations (art. 15), the conditions for lowering it to half-staff (art. 16, 17 and 18, with art. 20 describing exceptions to the rule), the conditions and manner for draping caskets with the flag (art. 19), as well as the place of the Romanian flag in case it flew besides one or more foreign flags (art. 21).

RPR flag from January to March 1948.

RPR flag from 1948 to 1952.

RPR flag from 1952 to 1965.

RPR flag from 1965 to 1989.

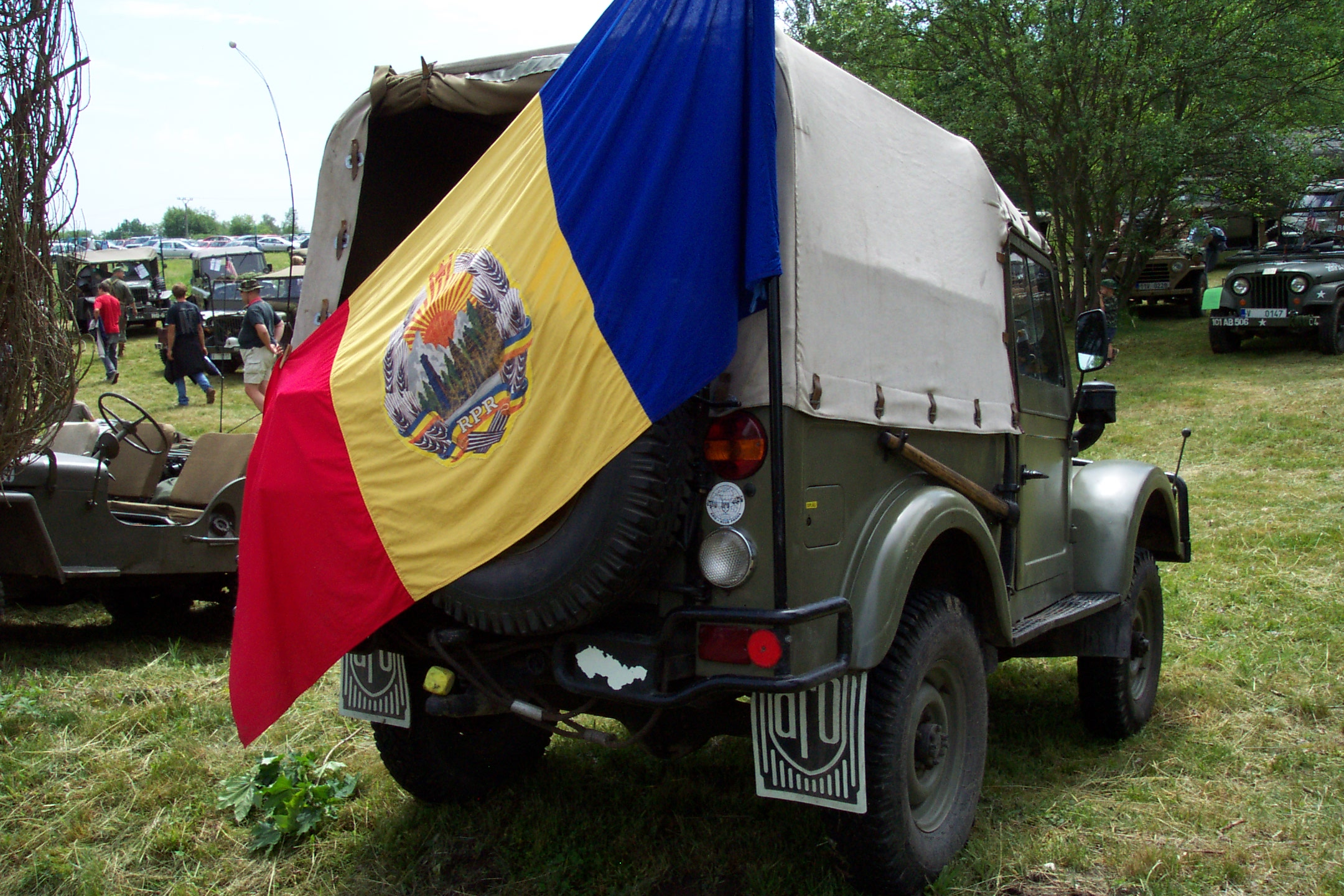
An ARO IMS with an RPR flag, 1952 design

== Flag of the Romanian Revolution of 1989 ==
Starting on 17 December 1989, during the revolution at Timișoara, the coat of arms of the Romanian Socialist Republic began to be removed from flags, being viewed as a symbol of Nicolae Ceaușescu's dictatorial regime. Most often, this was accomplished by cutting or ripping out the middle of the yellow stripe, giving rise to the term "the flag with the hole".

Decree-Law nr. 2 of 27 December 1989 regarding the membership, organization and functioning of the Council of the National Salvation Front and of the territorial councils of the National Salvation Front provided at article 1, among other matters, that "the national flag is the traditional tricolor of Romania, with the colors laid out vertically, in the following order, starting from the flagpole: blue, yellow, red".

Revolutionary flag with the hole.

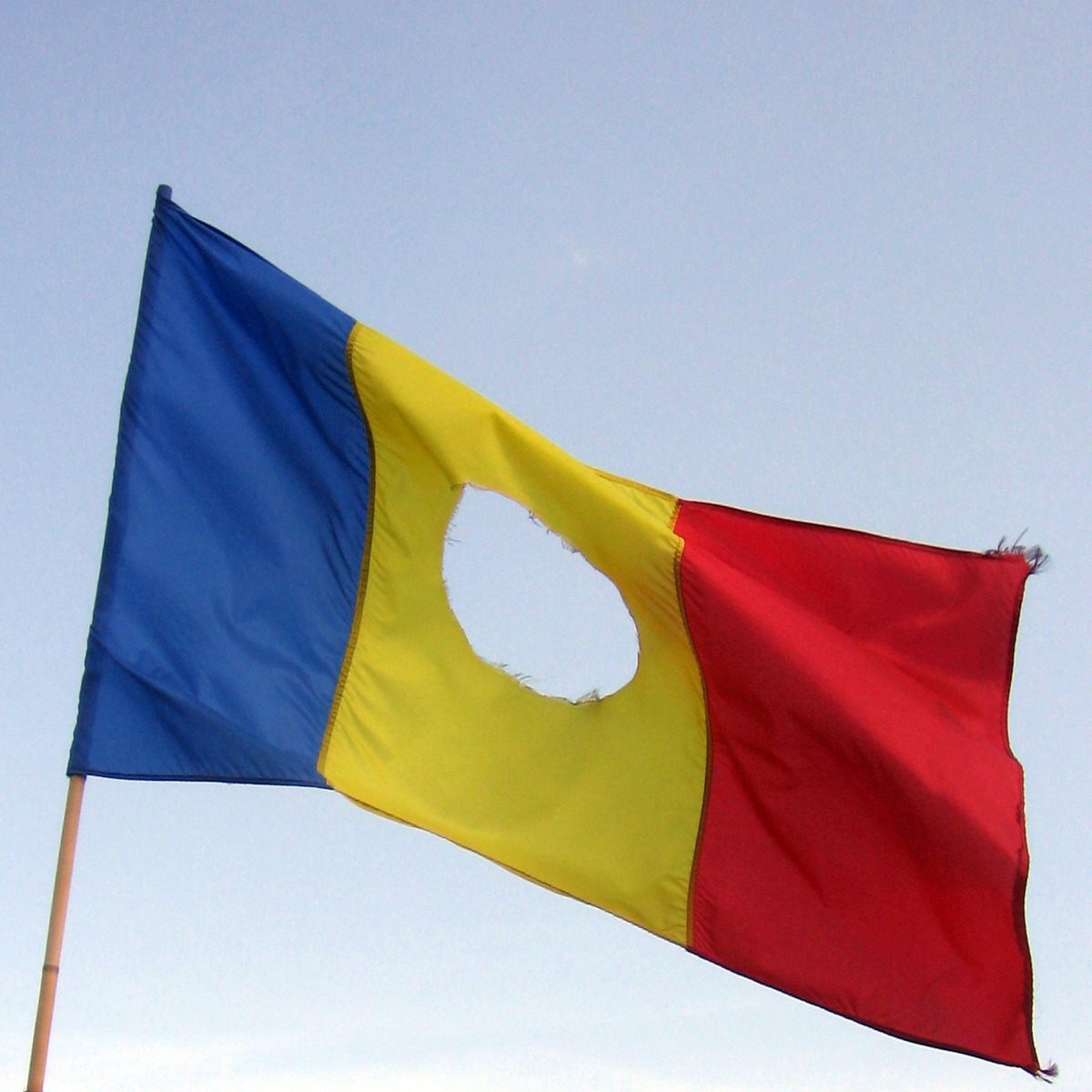
Photograph of such a flag.

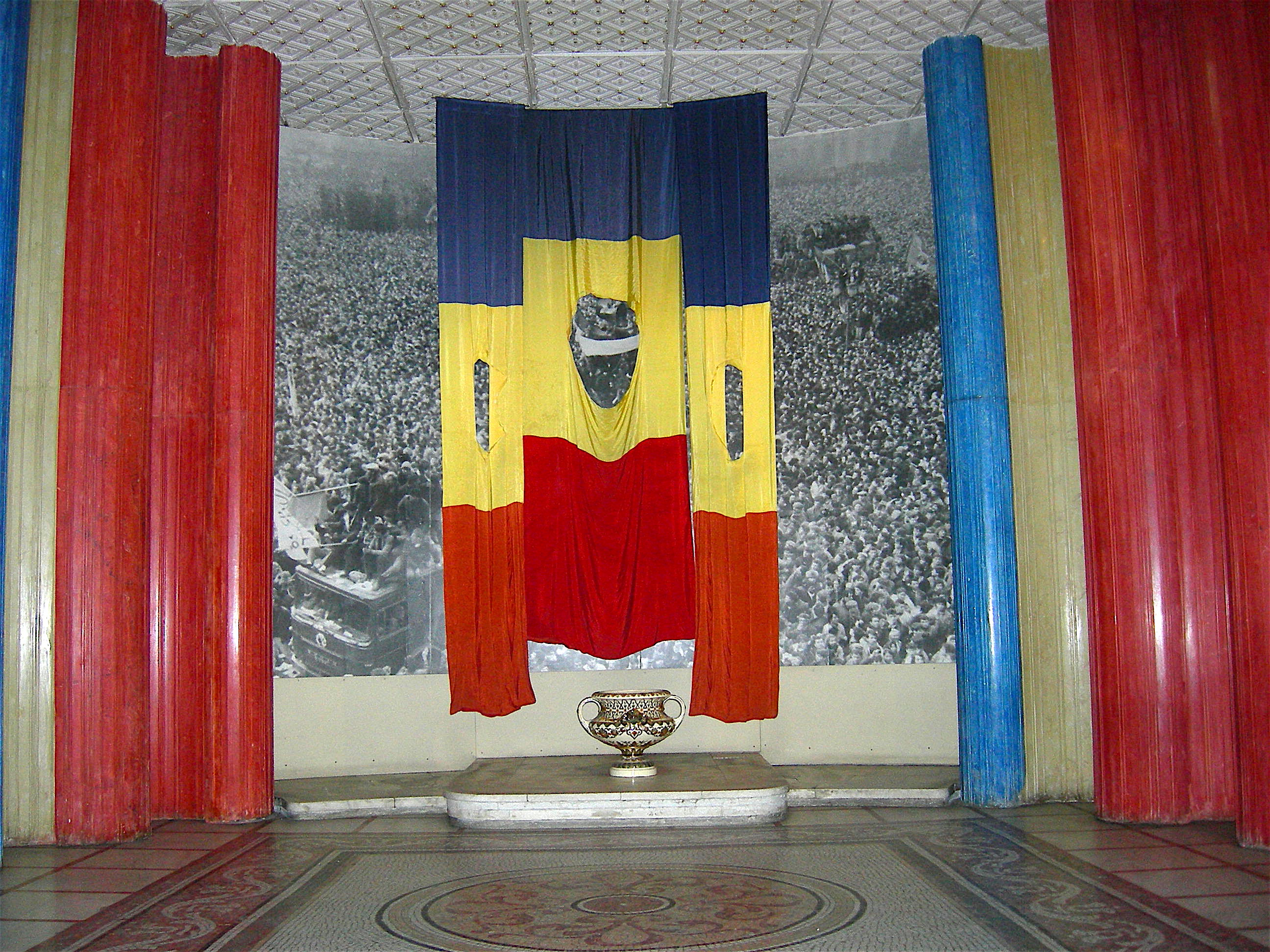
Flags with holes at the Military Museum in Bucharest.

== Storage, restoration and conservation of old flags ==
In the 19th century, after a modern army was established in the two Danubian Principalities, old military and princely flags were deposited at the Army Arsenal. In 1919 these were all transferred to the National Military Museum. Flags that witnessed the Romanian War of Independence were replaced in 1902 and kept until 1928–29 in the throne room of the Royal Palace, after which they entered the Military Museum's collection. In 1971 a significant number of old flags was given to the National History Museum.

In 1966, there were 1075 Romanian and foreign flags at the Central Military Museum, of which 949 were original, including the flagpole, top decoration and canvas, 42 were copies and reconstructions, and for 84, just the flagpole and decoration remained. Together with other categories of flags, standards, ship flags, pennants, sashes and ties, the collection reached 1248 items. By the mid-2000s, the museum's flag and standard collection counted 10,826 objects.

A majority of Romania's older flags have a field that is either deteriorated (some are missing almost entirely) or slashed by bullets or swords.

Museum experts have taken steps to preserve flags, including: introducing and stitching a double tulle into the majority of flags (starting in the 1930s), washing certain dust-covered flags using special methods, placing dark protective covers over the flags to shield the fabric from light, replacing seriously deteriorated exemplars with copies, photographing flags in order to avoid repeated manipulation, and climate-controlling storage areas and exhibit halls. Certain flags are also subject to restoration work.

== Acts of heroism under the flag ==
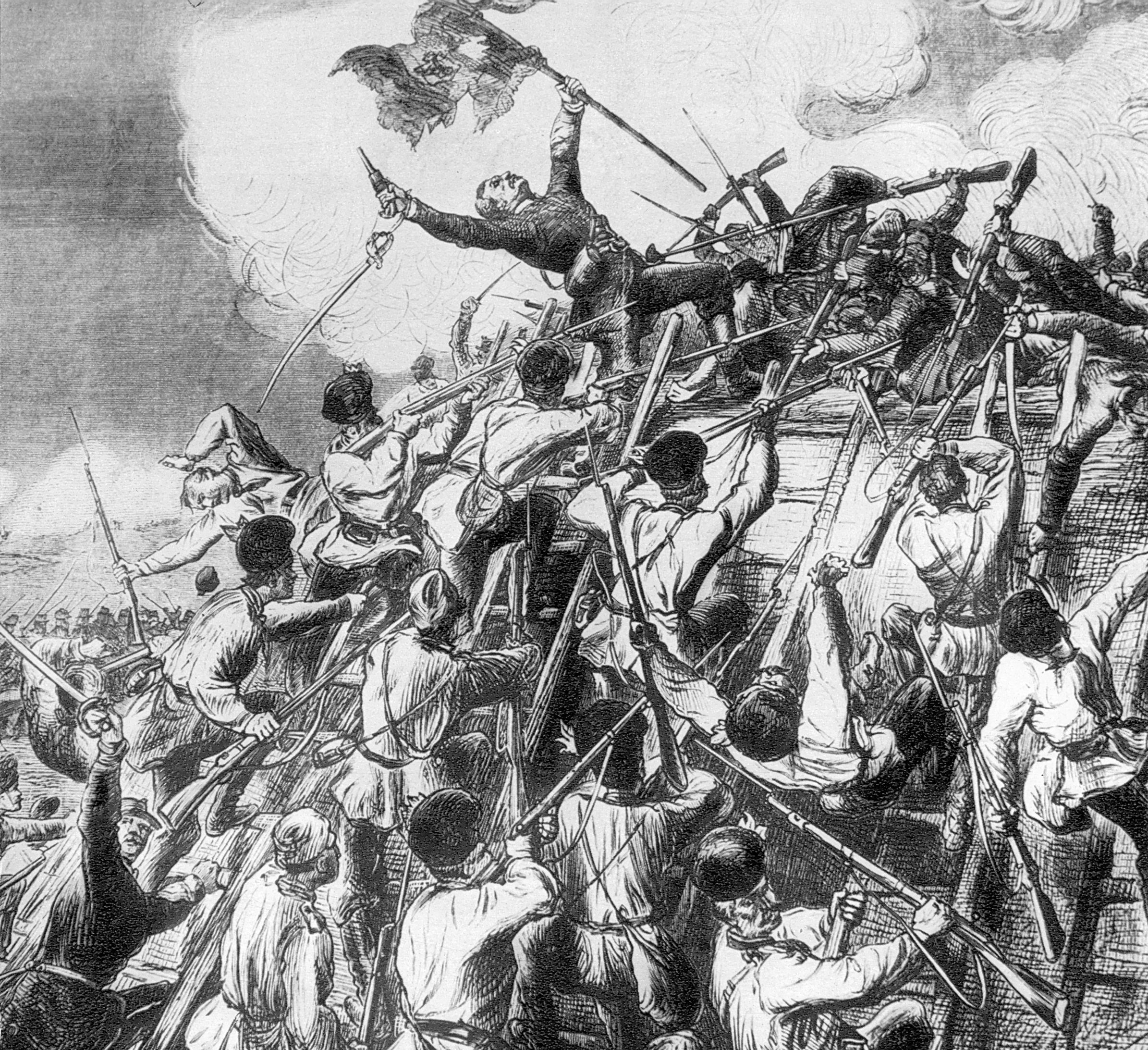
Capture of the Grivița redoubt. Lithograph by Carol Popp de Szathmary

During the Romanian War of Independence, Romanian troops were inspired to bravery by their flag's presence. During an attack on 30 August 1877, Captain Nicolae Valter Mărăcineanu fell in action while inserting the 8th line Regiment's flag into the parapet of the Grivița redoubt. Troops from the 3rd cavalry Regiment were among the first to enter Pleven, wading through the Vit with the flag before them.

Following these acts of bravery, the military colors were decorated in a solemn ceremony on 8 October 1878. Units that participated in the siege of Grivița (6th line infantry Regiment, dorobanți Regiments 6, 10, 13 and 14), that fought at Pleven (6th line infantry Regiment, dorobanți Regiments 6 and 14, vânători Battalions 2 and 4, cavalry Regiments 3 and 7), and Smârdan and Vidin (6th line infantry Regiment, 3rd artillery Regiment) received the Danube Crossing Cross (Crucea Trecerii Dunării). The 13th dorobanți Regiment also received the Order of the Star of Romania, along with three other regiments, while vânători Battalion 2 received the Great Cross of the Order of the Star of Romania. Among the others decorated were the 9th dorobanți Regiment and the 4th and 6th line infantry Regiments. Moreover, on 23 September 1879 in Galați, the flag of the 6th line infantry Regiment received the Military Bravery medal from Prince Milan IV of Serbia.

World War I also saw sacrifices in defense of the military colors, as a symbol of the duty to defend the nation's land and military honor. In October 1916, the flag guard of Neagoe Basarab Infantry Regiment 83 met a cavalry patrol of the German Army. Although one of his arms was sliced off, the regimental flag-bearer stood his ground until his comrades jumped to his defense and saved the flag. A month later, the Dolj infantry Regiment 1 found itself in dire circumstances, deciding to bury the flag in a peasant's yard in Izbiceni. It was recovered in autumn 1918 after the occupying foreign armies had been driven out. Coast Guard Regiment 1 also faced difficulty in fighting at the Olt Defile. Then, the unit commander decided to bury the eagle from atop the flag, while the canvas was wrapped around the body of a troop who snuck through the confusion. The flag was placed back on a pole in Moldavia and took part in the 1917 campaigns. At the end of the war, it was decorated with the Order of Michael the Brave, the Commemorative Cross of the War of 1916–1918 and the Victoria medal.

Many other military colors were decorated at war's end. To name but a few examples, heavy artillery Regiment 1 received the Order of the Star of Romania (rank of knight with swords) and the ribbon of Military Virtue. Heavy artillery Regiment 4 was decorated with the Order of the Star of Romania and the Commemorative Cross of the War of 1916–1918. The Mircea Regiment 32 received the Order of Michael the Brave. Infantry Regiment 70, "giving proof of the noblest spirit of sacrifice and a powerful patriotism", received the Order of Michael the Brave Class III and the Commemorative Cross 1916–1918.

During World War II, units' flags that appeared in battle were also decorated. In action on the Western Front, ant-aircraft artillery Regiment 6 and vânători Regiment 2 were decorated with the Order of Aeronautic Virtue with swords. Among the units that received the Order of Michael the Brave with swords were cavalry Regiment 2, which distinguished itself in battles on the Someș and Mureș rivers and in Czechoslovakia, infantry Regiment 96, which broke through the Tisza and liberated Budapest, Regiments 18 artillery and 34 infantry, and Battalions 7 and 8 vânători de munte.

== See also ==
- Flag of Romania
- List of Romanian flags
- Coat of arms of Romania
- List of Romanian coats of arms

== Bibliography ==
Laws, decrees, decisions and regulations

- Distribuția steagurilor la oștire, 1 septembrie 1863, in Monitorul. Jurnal oficial al Principatelor Unite Române, nr. 171 of 2 September 1863.
- Legea pentru modificarea armelor țării published in Monitorul Oficial al României, nr. 57 of 11/23 March 1872.
- Decretul nr. 3 privind fixarea atribuțiunilor Prezidiumului Republicii Populare Române, published in Monitorul Oficial, nr. 7 of 9 January 1948, p. 154.
- Decretul nr. 189 pentru înființarea drapelului de luptă al Forțelor Armate ale Republicii Popular Române, precum și a pavilioanelor Forțelor Aeriene Militare și Marinei Militare, published in Buletinul Oficial, year II, nr. 66 of 2 August 1950.
- Decretul nr. 124 pentru modificarea art. 4 din Decretul nr. 189 privind înființarea drapelului de luptă al Forțelor Armate ale Republicii Popular Române, precum și a pavilioanelor Forțelor Aeriene Militare și Marinei Militare, published in Buletinul Oficial, year III, nr. 82 of 28 July 1951.
- Decretul nr. 93 pentru modificarea art. 4 din Decretul nr. 189 privind înființarea drapelului de luptă al Forțelor Armate ale Republicii Popular Române, precum și a pavilioanelor Forțelor Aeriene Militare și Marinei Militare, published in Buletinul Oficial, nr. 18 of 17 April 1954.
- Decretul nr. 1016 privind reglementarea acordării drapelului de luptă al unităților și marilor unități de toate armele, modificarea înfățișării pavilioanelor și flamurilor navelor marinei militare și navelor grănicerești, înființarea mărcii distinctive și mărcilor de comandament la navele marinei militare și navele grănicerești, a geacului pentru navele marinei militare și a pavilionului distinctiv pentru navele grănicerești, published in Buletinul Official, nr. 82 of 24 December 1966.
- Decretul nr. 972 privind însemnele Republicii Socialiste România, published in Buletinul Oficial, nr. 141 of 5 November 1968.
- Decretul nr. 90 privind instituirea drapelului de luptă al gărzilor patriotice și reglementarea acordării acestuia, published in Buletinul Oficial, nr. 36 of 27 April 1977.
- Decret-Lege nr. 2/1989 privind constituirea, organizarea și funcționarea Consiliului Frontului Salvării Naționale și a consiliilor teritoriale ale Frontului Salvării Naționale, published in Buletinul Oficial nr. 4 of 27 December 1989.

Other works

- Andrieș-Tabac, Silviu, Heraldica teritorială a Basarabiei și Transnistriei, Ed. Museum, Chișinău, 1998.
- Bunea, Aurelia, "Steagul poporului român din Transilvania în revoluția din anii 1848–1849", in Anuarul Institutului de Istorie, Cluj, nr. 12 / 1969.
- Căzănișteanu, Constantin, "Trei culori cunosc pe lume..." in Magazin istoric, nr. 8/1967.
- Cernovodeanu, Dan, Știința și arta heraldică în România, Ed. Științifică și Enciclopedică, Bucharest, 1977.
- Dogaru, Maria, "Tricolorul și cocardele în contextul luptei revoluționarilor pașoptiști", in Revista de istorie nr. 5 of 31 May 1978 (extract).
- Mănescu, Jean Nicholas, "Acvila României, simbol heraldic al statului unitar modern", in Magazin istoric, nr. 4 of April 1991.
- Mihalache, Marin, Cuza Vodă, Ed. Tineretului, 1967.
- Moisil, Constantin, "Însemnele regalității române", in Enciclopedia României, vol. I, 1938.
- Năsturel, Petre Vasiliu, "Steagul și stema României. Perioada convențională", in Albina, year IV, 1900/1901, nr. 10; nr. 38; nr. 151.
- Pălănceanu, Elena, "Steaguri din colecția Muzeului de Istorie al Republicii Socialiste România", in Muzeul Național, vol. I, 1974.
- Popescu, Elena and Căzănișteanu, Constantin, "Piese din colecția de drapele a Muzeului Militar Central", in Revista Muzeelor, year III, nr. 2 / 1966.
- Vasile, Alexandru, "Drapelul este istoria întreagă a României" in Lupta întregului popor, nr. 1 (3) of 1985.
- Velcu, Anton, "Steagurile României" in Enciclopedia României, vol. I, 1938.

Vexilological albums

- Ottfried Neubecker, Flaggenbuch. Bearbeitet und herausgegeben vom Oberkommando der Kriegsmarine. Abgesclossen am 1. December 1939, Druck und Verlag der Reichsdruckerei, Berlin, 1939. 2nd edition of 1992, with corrections and additions.
- Pierre, Album des pavillons nationaux et des marques distinctives des états et des principales organizations internationales, Service Hydrographique et Océanographique de la Marine, Brest, 1990, ISBN 978-2-11-080563-8.
- Armand du Payrat, Daniel Roudaut, Album des pavillons nationaux et des marques distinctives, Service Hydrographique et Océanographique de la Marine, Brest, 2000, ISBN 978-2-11-088247-9.
