= Mărăcineanu =

Mărăcineanu is a Romanian-language surname that may refer to:

- Roxana Mărăcineanu, French politician, swimmer, and TV consultant
- Ștefania Mărăcineanu, Romanian physicist
- Valter Mărăcineanu, Romanian soldier
