= Constitution of Romania =

Fundamental governing document of Romania

- The current version of the Constitution of Romania, as published in the Official Gazette of 31 October 2003, following the approval of amendments in a referendum on 18 October.
- Created: 21 November 1991
- Ratified: 8 December 1991
- Author: Antonie Iorgovan et al.
- Purpose: To replace the Communist 1965 constitution

Full text
- Constitution of Romania at Wikisource

The current Constitution of Romania is the seventh permanent constitution in modern Romania's history. It is the fundamental governing document of Romania that establishes the structure of its government, the rights and obligations of citizens, and its mode of passing laws. It stands as the basis of the legitimacy of the Romanian government. Adopted on 21 November 1991, it was approved on 8 December 1991 in a national referendum and promulgated on the same day.

The constitution was amended once by a referendum on 18 October 2003. The new text took effect on 29 October 2003.

== Structure ==
The Constitution of 1991, as revised in 2003, contains 156 articles, divided into 8 titles:

- Title I - General principles
- Title II - Fundamental rights, liberties, and duties
- Title III - Public authorities
- Title IV - The economy and public finance
- Title V - Constitutional Court
- Title VI - Euro-Atlantic integration
- Title VII - Revising the Constitution
- Title VIII - Final and transitional provisions

== Background ==
Regulamentul Organic, voted by the respective Assemblies of Moldavia and Wallachia under Imperial Russian occupation in 1831–1832, was the first organic law resembling a constitution ever awarded to the Danubian Principalities. It remained in place until 1858, when the Crimean War removed the two countries from Russian influence and confirmed the rule by several European powers first established by the Treaty of Paris; the Paris Convention of 1858 remained the governing document following the election of Alexandru Ioan Cuza as Domnitor (ruling prince) over the united countries (1859), but was replaced by Cuza's own organic law, entitled Statutul dezvoltător al Convenţiei de la Paris ("Statute expanding the Paris Convention"), in 1864. Although the newly minted state was nominally still a vassal of the Ottoman Empire, it only acknowledged the suzerainty of the Sublime Porte in a formal way.

The first constitution of the Romanian United Principalities was adopted 1 July 1866. It was retained after Romania became a kingdom in 1881. After the extension of national territory in 1918, a new constitution was approved 29 March 1923. It was repealed by King Carol II in 1938 and replaced with a corporatist/authoritarian document with the king's National Renaissance Front as the sole legal party. This document was, in turn, cancelled in 1940 by the National Legionary State government under Ion Antonescu and the Iron Guard. Antonescu broke his alliance with the Guard in 1941, and ruled by decree until his overthrow in 1944. The 1923 constitution was reinstated pending the adoption of a new constitution (see Romania during World War II).

The monarchy was abolished in 1947. In March 1948, the first constitution of Communist Romania was adopted; it was heavily modeled on the Soviet constitution. Two other constitutions appeared during the Communist era, in 1952 and 1965 (the former "building socialism", the latter announcing the "socialism has won" and notably making the change from a people's republic to a socialist republic). Following the collapse of the Communist regime in 1989, much of the 1965 document was suspended, though portions remained in effect until the present document was adopted in 1991.

== Initial version (1991) ==
The 1991 Constitution was composed by a committee of parliamentarians and constitutional law specialists; was approved by Parliament, meeting as a Constituent Assembly, by a vote of 414 to 95 on 21 November 1991, being published in Monitorul Oficial the same day; and was approved by referendum on 8 December 1991, with 77.3% voting in favour. The 1991 Constitution contains 7 titles and 152 articles. Romania is defined as a "national, sovereign, independent, unitary and indivisible state". The form of government is a republic, headed by a president who serves a four-year term and who is eligible for a second term. The president represents the Romanian state in domestic and foreign relations, ensures obedience to the constitution and the proper functioning of state institutions, and is the guarantor of the state's independence, unity and integrity. Parliament is "the supreme representative organ of the Romanian people and the sole lawmaking authority"; it is bicameral (Chamber of Deputies and Senate) and elected for four years. After the prime minister is named by the president, Parliament validates the composition and programme of the Government and can dismiss it following a motion of censure. The constitution provides for fundamental civic rights and freedoms, and creates the office of Romanian Ombudsman to ensure these are respected.

== First revision (2003) ==
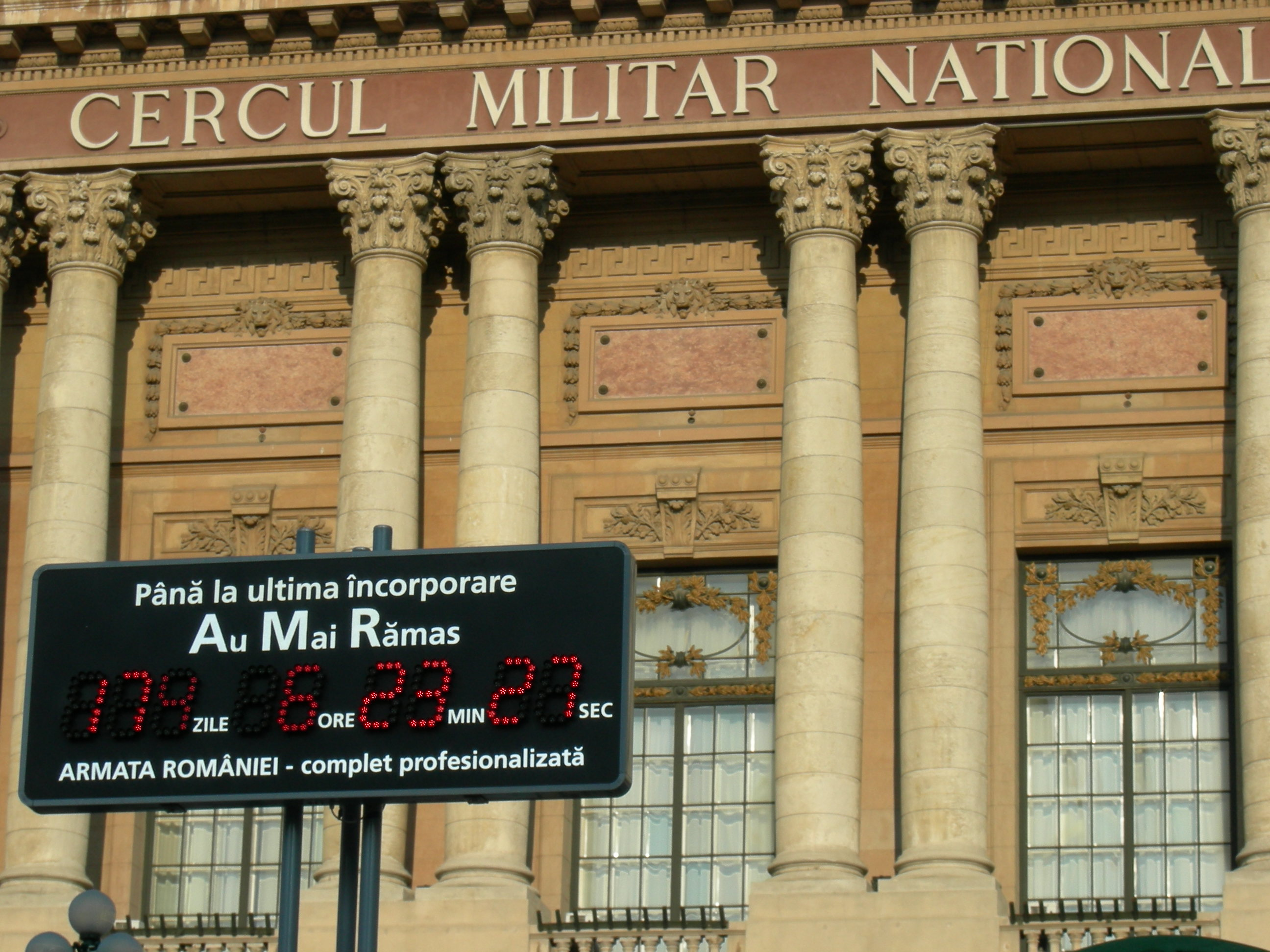
A sign in front of Cercul Militar Național counts down to the "complete professionalization" of the Romanian military, that is, the end of conscription (May 2006).

The 1991 Constitution was first amended in 2003. Articles were introduced on "Integration into the European Union" and "NATO Accession", bringing the total to 156 in 8 titles. These specified that both could take place by parliamentary vote alone, and that EU citizens living in Romania can vote and run in local elections. The revised constitution grants minorities the right to use their native language when dealing with local administration and the courts, improves the functioning of the legislative chambers (better specifying their attributes) and restricts the privilege of parliamentary immunity to political declarations, extends the president's term to five years, explicitly "guarantees" rather than "protects" the right to private property and removes the constitutional obligation for conscription (which ended in 2006). The revised document was adopted by referendum on 18–19 October 2003; turnout was slightly above the 50%+1 threshold needed for it to be valid, with 55.7% of 17,842,103 eligible voters showing up. The opposition and NGOs alleged serious irregularities. 89.70% voted yes and 8.81%, no. It came into force ten days later.

== Proposed second revision ==
The issue of constitutional reform was raised repeatedly in the early 2010s, especially after a major political crisis in the second half of 2012. The ruling coalition at the time, the Social Liberal Union, claimed that insufficient constitutional constraints led then-incumbent President Traian Băsescu to abuse his presidential powers, thus justifying new amendments. A public debate began in 2013 and a Parliamentary Commission for the Revision of the Constitution was established. However, the reform project stalled as the Social Liberal Union dissolved in early 2014 and Băsescu ended his term later that year.

Băsescu's successor, Klaus Iohannis, expressed support for a second revision of the Constitution, as did Prime Minister Victor Ponta, who stated that such a revision should be a political priority in 2015, as there are no elections scheduled in Romania that year. On 18 January 2015, the vice-president of the Parliamentary Commission, Valeria Schelean, requested the immediate convocation of the commission to begin working on amendments.

== 2018 referendum ==
On 6 and 7 October 2018 a referendum took place regarding the definition of the family as provided by Article 48 of the Constitution (that defines the family as being founded on the free-willed marriage "between spouses"), to prohibit same-sex marriage. The referendum failed as the turnout was only 21.1%, below the required voter turnout threshold of 30%.

== See also ==
=== Former constitutions ===
- First Constitution of Romania (1866)
- Second Constitution of Romania (1923)
- Third Constitution of Romania (1938)
- Fourth Constitution of Romania (1948)
- Fifth Constitution of Romania (1952)
- Sixth Constitution of Romania (1965)
