= Constitution of 1952 =

Constitution of 1952 may refer to:

- Constitution of Hamburg of 1952
- Constitution of Poland of 1952
- Constitution of Romania of 1952
- Constitution of Uruguay of 1952
