= Constitution of 1948 =

Constitution of 1948 may refer to:

- 1948 Constitution of Czechoslovakia
- 1948 Constitution of Romania
