= 1965 Constitution of Romania =

Constitution of Romania
- Created: 28 June 1965
- Ratified: 21 August 1965
- Purpose: Replace the 1952 Constitution

The 1965 Constitution of Romania was a communist state constitution drafted by a committee of the Great National Assembly (MAN) and approved by a plenary session of the Central Committee of the Romanian Communist Party on 28 June 1965. It was then debated at the party's 9th Congress in July and adopted by the MAN, sitting as a Constituent Assembly, on 21 August, being published in Monitorul Oficial that day. It was Romania's sixth constitution, and the third of the Communist era.

The document that formed the legal basis for the dictatorship of Nicolae Ceaușescu (who had come to power that March), this constitution brought changes to the organization and name of the state, and to the expression of its foreign policy. It changed the state's official name from the Romanian People's Republic to the Socialist Republic of Romania. The "brotherly" alliance with the Soviet Union was replaced with the principle of "respect for national sovereignty and independence, equality of rights and reciprocal advantage, non-interference in internal matters". The state enhanced its involvement in the economy ("it organises, plans and leads the national economy") and had a monopoly on foreign trade. Like its 1948 and 1952 predecessors, it granted a series of freedoms, including speech, press, assembly, meetings and demonstrations. These rights were effectively neutered in practice by a provision that banned organizations "of a fascist or antidemocratic character" (carried over from its predecessors), and another that forbade the exercise of constitutional freedoms "for purposes against the socialist structure and the interests of those who work". As for the state organisation, alongside the MAN, which in theory remained the supreme leadership organ, the office of president of the republic appeared for the first time in Romanian history (via a 1974 amendment), with attributes that gave it, in the framework of the existing system, dictatorial powers.

The 1965 Constitution was modified 10 times between 1968 and 1986, after which it contained 121 articles in 9 titles. It was partly abrogated in December 1989, following the Revolution; some clauses continued in operation until 8 December 1991, when the current constitution was adopted.
