= 1991 Romanian constitutional referendum =

| 8 December 1991 |
- Do you approve of the Romanian Constitution adopted by the Constituent Assembly on 21 November 1991?

Results
| Choice | Votes | % |
|---|---|---|
| Yes | 8,464,624 | 79.11% |
| No | 2,235,085 | 20.89% |
| Valid votes | 10,699,709 | 97.73% |
| Invalid or blank votes | 248,759 | 2.27% |
| Total votes | 10,948,468 | 100.00% |

A constitutional referendum was held in Romania on 8 December 1991. The new constitution was approved by 79% of voters.

== Results ==
| Choice | Votes | % |
|---|---|---|
| For | 8,464,624 | 79.11 |
| Against | 2,235,085 | 20.89 |
| Total | 10,699,709 | 100.00 |
| Valid votes | 10,699,709 | 97.73 |
| Invalid/blank votes | 248,759 | 2.27 |
| Total votes | 10,948,468 | 100.00 |
| Registered voters/turnout | | 67.3 |
Source: Nohlen & Stöver, Direct Democracy
