= 2003 Romanian constitutional referendum =

- 18–19 October 2003
- Do you agree with the law on the revision of the Romanian Constitution in the form adopted by the Parliament

Results
Choice	Votes	%
Yes	8,915,022	91.06%
No	875,172	8.94%
Valid votes	9,790,194	98.51%
Invalid or blank votes	148,247	1.49%
Total votes	9,938,441	100.00%
Registered voters/turnout	17,842,103	55.7%
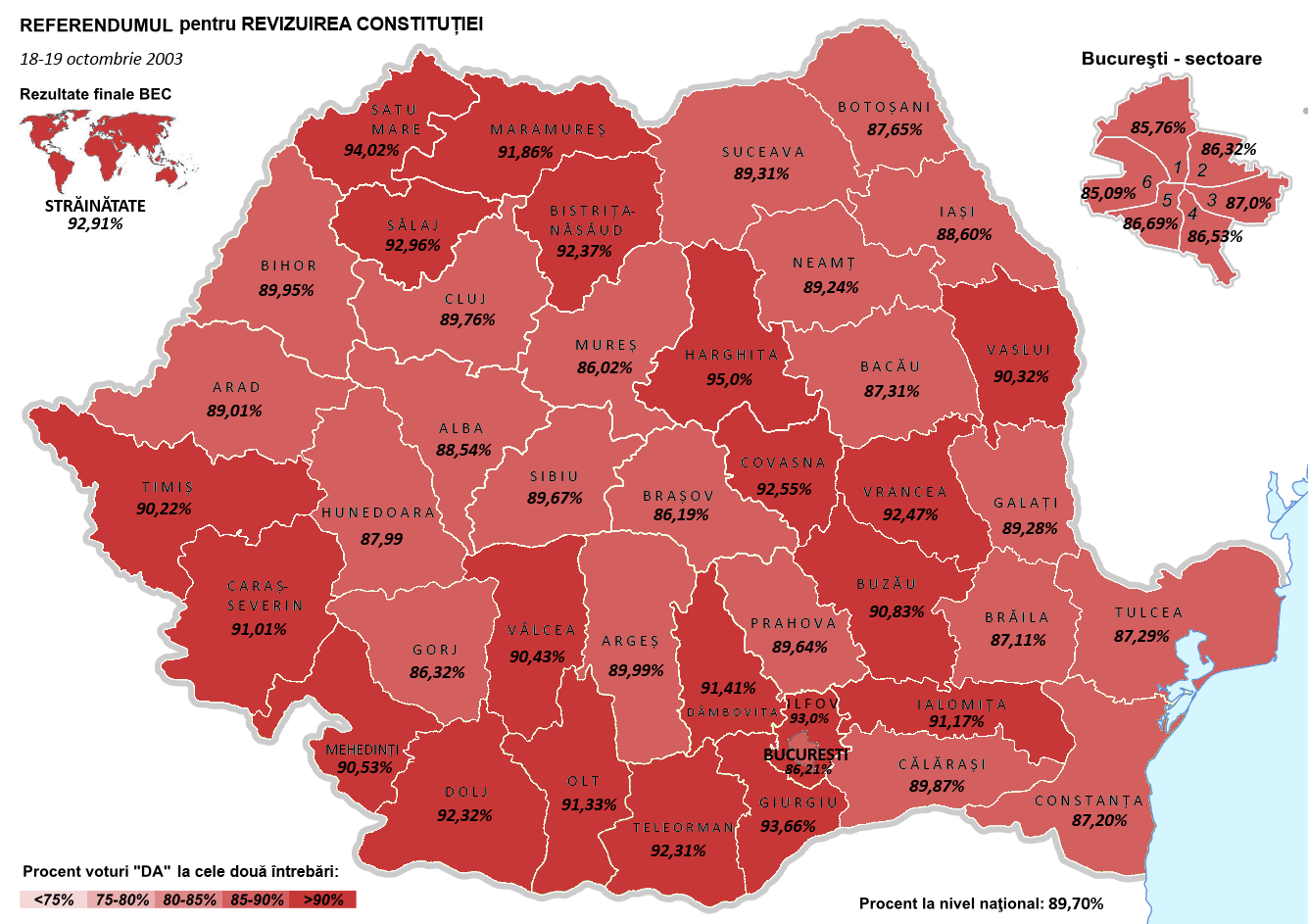
- Yes vote by county, including sectors of Bucharest and the diaspora.

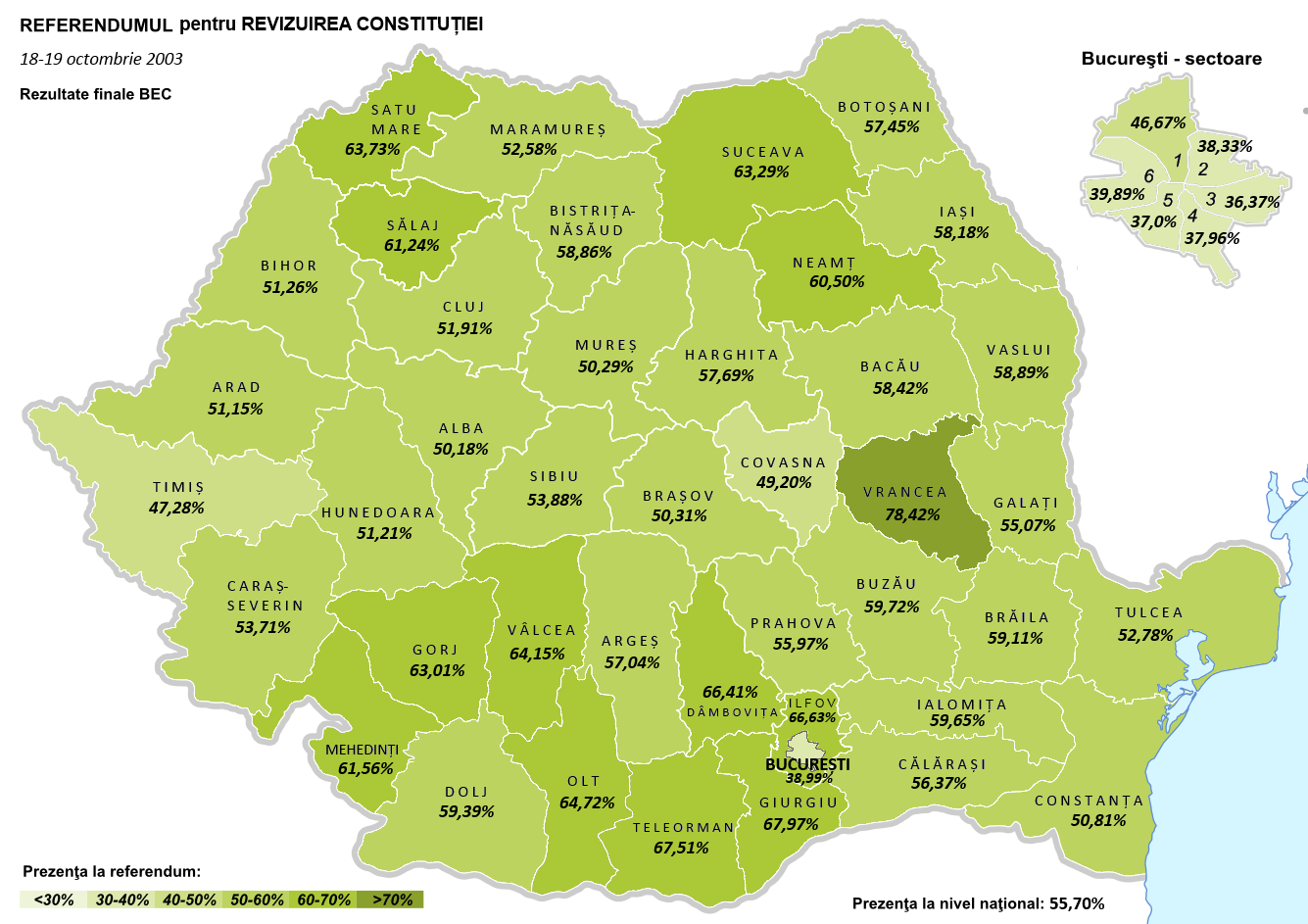
Vote participation by county

A constitutional referendum was held in Romania on 18 and 19 October 2003. The proposed amendments to the constitution were approved by 91.1% of voters.

The 2003 referendum was the first revision of the Romanian constitution since its inception on 8 December 1991. The referendum included a variety of major changes to the constitution, namely in Articles 1, 2, 5, 9, 11, 15, 16, 20, and 21. Additionally, it included rules that heavily influenced criminal proceedings and how long the courts could hold an individual in preventive custody. The constitutional revision from 2003 also guarantees that "A person’s freedom to develop his/her spirituality and to get access to the values of national and universal culture shall not be limited."

== Results ==
Choice	Votes	%
For	8,915,022	91.06
Against	875,172	8.94
Total	9,790,194	100.00
Valid votes	9,790,194	98.51
Invalid/blank votes	148,247	1.49
Total votes	9,938,441	100.00
Registered voters/turnout	17,842,103	55.70
Source: Nohlen & Stöver
