= 1952 Constitution of Romania =

Constitution of Romania
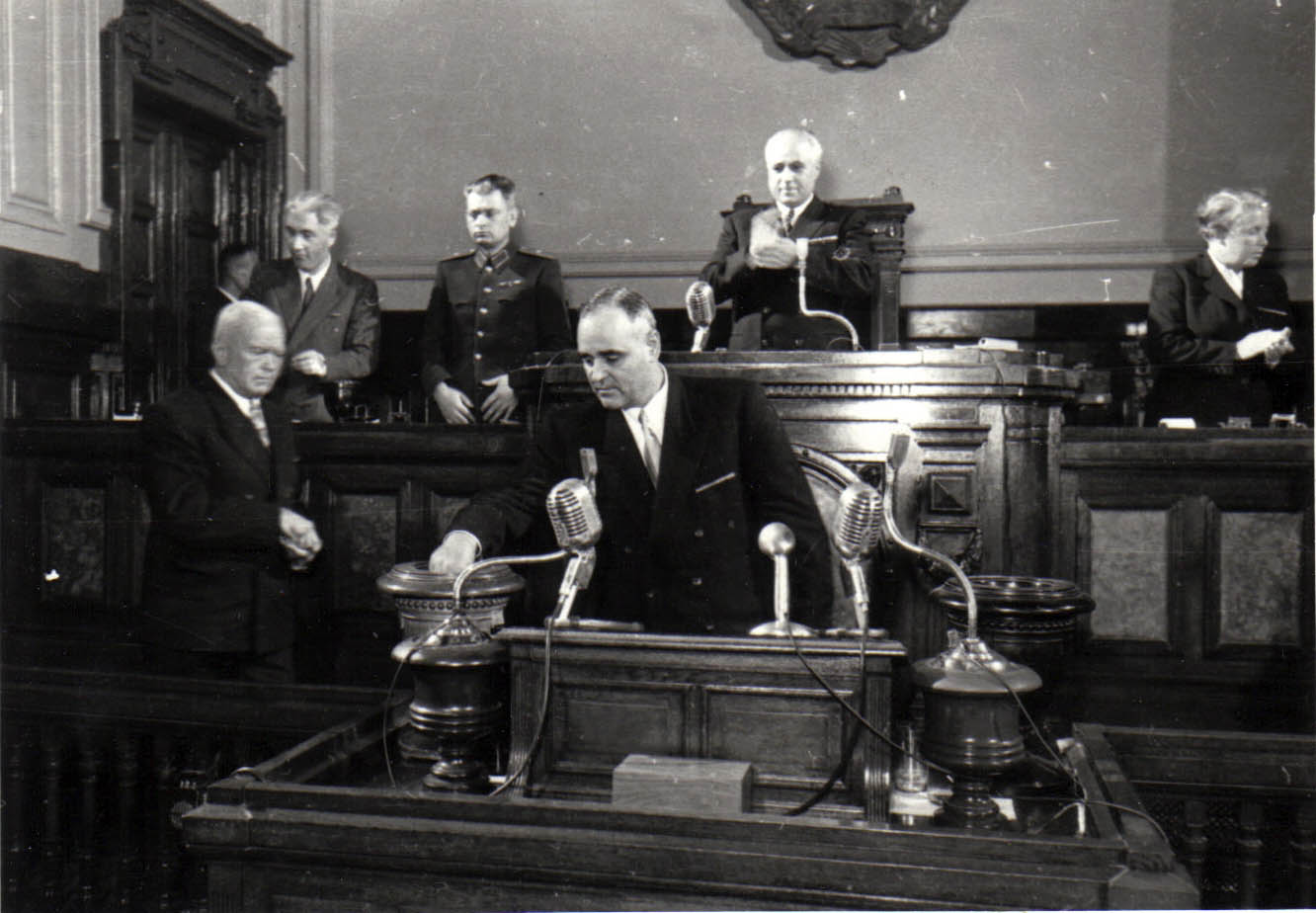
- Workers' Party First Secretary and Prime Minister Gheorghe Gheorghiu-Dej (at microphones) and head of state Petru Groza (at left) cast their ballots in favour of the Constitution.
- Created: 1952
- Ratified: 24 September 1952
- Purpose: Replace the 1948 Constitution

The 1952 Constitution of Romania, also called the "constitution of building socialism", was the second communist state constitution of Romania. It marked the consolidation of Communist power, featuring greater ideological content than its 1948 predecessor. A draft was written by a commission elected by the Great National Assembly on March 27, 1952, and published on July 18. By a 324-0 vote, it was adopted by the Great National Assembly on September 24, when it came into force, and published three days later.

The document contained an introductory chapter and ten further chapters containing 105 articles. Romania was proclaimed a "state of working people from the cities and villages" that "was born as a result of the historic victory of the Soviet Union against German fascism and the liberation of Romania by the glorious Red Army, a liberation that empowered the working people, above all the working class led by the Communist Party, to demolish the fascist dictatorship, to destroy the power of the exploiting classes and to build a state of popular democracy, which fully coincides with the interests and hopes of Romania's popular masses". The document provided for the state's independence and sovereignty to be "defended" by the "friendship and alliance with the great Soviet Union". The state's domestic politics were oriented toward "liquidating the exploitation of man by man and the construction of socialism" by strengthening and increasing the socialist sector of the economy and by realizing "in consequence a policy of limiting and eliminating capitalist elements". Among the Romanian state's functions were to repress "the classes removed from power" and to defend against external aggression. Through explicit provisions, the state was to have a dominant role not only in the economy, but also in areas such as education and culture.

Regarding political institutions, there was no change from the preceding constitution, the Great National Assembly continuing as the supreme organ of state power, while local governing bodies were now known as "popular assemblies" (sfaturi populare). The Romanian Workers' Party was proclaimed "the leading force both of those who work, as well as of the state organs and institutions", at the same time gathering around itself "all organisations of those who work". Like its predecessor, the constitution enshrined citizens' fundamental rights and freedoms. In practice, these freedoms were not respected. For example, the constitutional guarantee of freedom of association was effectively neutered by a provision that banned associations of a "fascist or antidemocratic character," which was broadly interpreted to ban nearly all associations that opposed Communist rule.

Modified 11 times in the ensuing years, the 1952 Constitution was abrogated on August 21, 1965, when the 1965 Constitution of Romania came into force.
