= 1948 Constitution of Romania =

Constitution of Romania
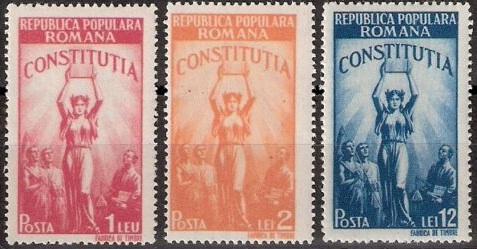
- Postage stamps commemorating the constitution
- Ratified: 13 April 1948
- Purpose: Replace the re-established and modified 1923 Constitution

Full text
- Constitution of Romania (1948) at Wikisource

The 1948 Constitution of Romania was the communist state constitution of the Romanian People's Republic, which it enshrined into law. It was modelled on the 1936 Soviet Constitution and adopted by the Great National Assembly (MAN) on 13 April 1948, being published in Monitorul Oficial the same day. The Romanian People's Republic was defined as a "unitary and sovereign people's state" that "came into being through a struggle led by the people, the working class at their head, against fascism, reaction and imperialism".

It proclaimed the principle of the sovereignty of the people, who "exercises its power through representative organs, elected by universal, equal, direct and secret vote". In reality, because a single party, the Romanian Workers' Party, controlled all the levers of power, this principle was never put into practice. In a first for a constitutional act in Romania, provisions were introduced dealing with the socio-economic structure of society, indicating the existence of three categories of property: state-owned ("as goods of the entire citizenry"), cooperative and private. The superior nature of state-owned property was spelled out, as was the duty of each citizen to help expand its scope. In order to provide a constitutional basis for the waves of nationalization that were to come, it was provided that "when the general interest demands it, the means of production, banks and insurance societies, which are the private property of physical or juridical persons, may become State property, that is a public good, under conditions provided by law". The state was to defend "working people" against "exploitation" and to raise their standard of living. The principle of guiding and planning the national economy was introduced, while domestic and foreign trade was regulated and controlled by the state.

Regarding rights and freedoms, equality before the law was guaranteed for all citizens, who were also assured the right to vote and be elected, and to work and rest. Minorities were allowed to use their languages in education, and freedom of conscience and of religion were provided for within the framework of state-recognised religions, so long as these did not violate "public security and good morals". Freedom of the press, of speech and of assembly and association were also included, though any association of a "fascist or antidemocratic character" was explicitly forbidden. In reality, all the rights proclaimed by the constitution were systematically and severely violated in the first years of the Communist regime, which saw the start of repression unprecedented in Romanian history. The ban on associations of "fascist or antidemocratic character" was broadly interpreted to suppress nearly all meaningful opposition.

The MAN became the supreme organ of state power, elected for a four-year term. Executive power was exercised by a government, answerable for its activities before the MAN and the MAN Presidium. The local organs of state power were the Popular Councils, also elected for four years. As for judicial power, people's associate judges (asesori populari) were granted the right to sit in judgment. The subordination of the judicial system to the Communist authorities was provided for, inter alia, by granting the prosecutor’s office the role of punishing "crimes against the democratic order and liberty, the economic interests, the national independence and the sovereignty of the Romanian State". The 1948 Constitution, which contained 105 articles in 10 titles, was amended once, in March 1952, and abrogated on 24 September 1952, when a new constitution came into force.
