= Valter Mărăcineanu =

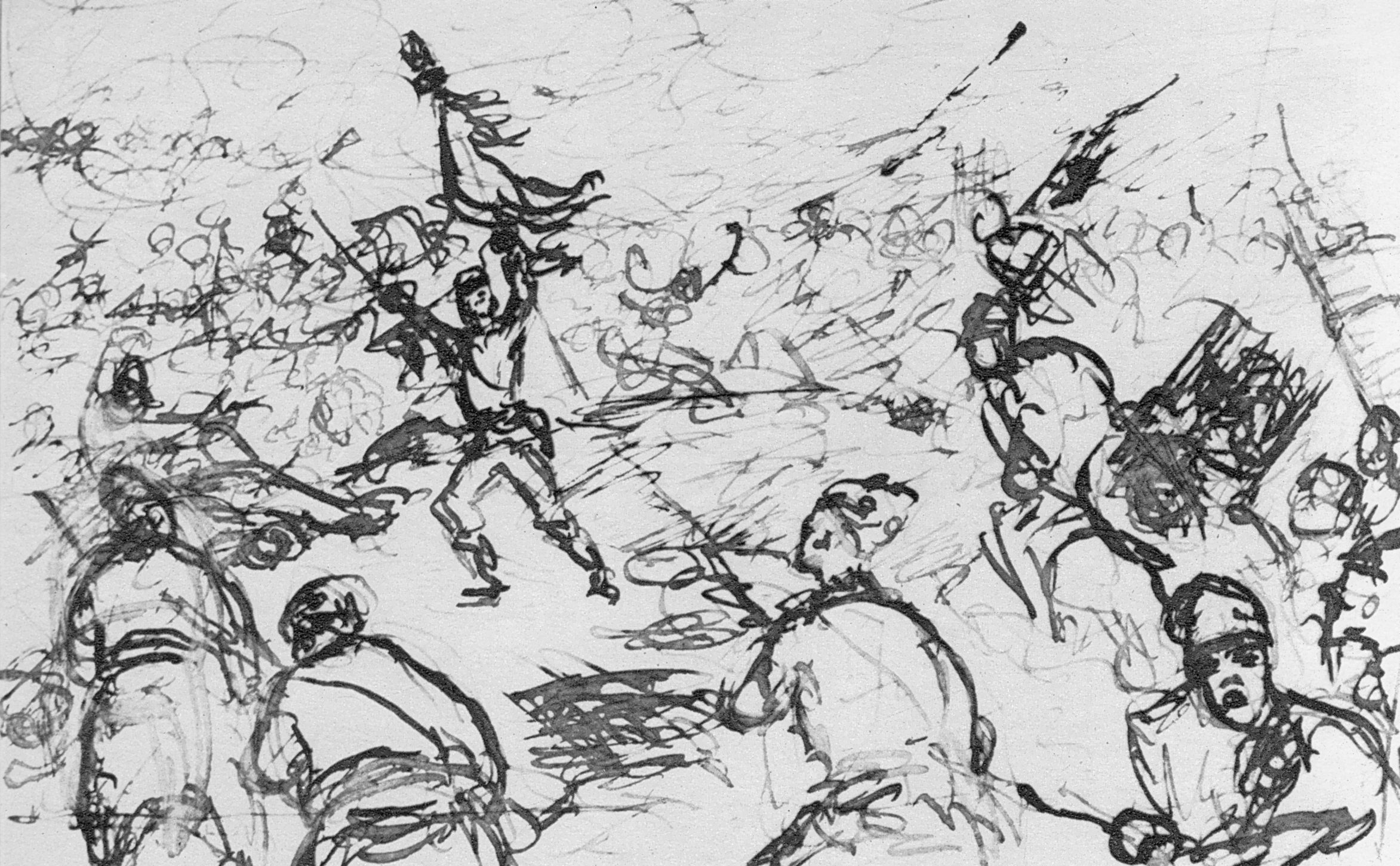
Sketch of Mărăcineanu leading his troops at Grivitsa, by Oscar Obedeanu

Nicolae Valter Mărăcineanu (May 30, 1840 — September 11 [O.S. August 30] 1877) was a Romanian soldier.

He was born in Craiova, in the Oltenia region of Wallachia. Entering the Land Forces as a volunteer Sergeant in 1858, he was promoted to 2nd Lieutenant in 1861 and Captain in 1868. He fought in the Romanian War of Independence, where he was part of the 8th Line Regiment, commanding its 1st Battalion. During the first of three assaults against the Grivitsa I redoubt of the defensive works of the Pleven fortifications, he shouted while at the head of his troops, "După mine, copii!" ("After me, children!"). Holding his sword in one hand and a tricolor flag in another, he reached the citadel's edge, after which he fell into a ditch, riddled with bullets. Following the first retreat of the Romanian troops, the Ottoman soldiers guarding the redoubt took the bodies of Mărăcineanu and of Major Gheorghe Șonțu, sticking them as trophies onto the redoubt's parapet.

After the war, a street near Bucharest's Cișmigiu Gardens was named in honour of Mărăcineanu.
