= Monitorul Oficial =

Government gazette of Romania

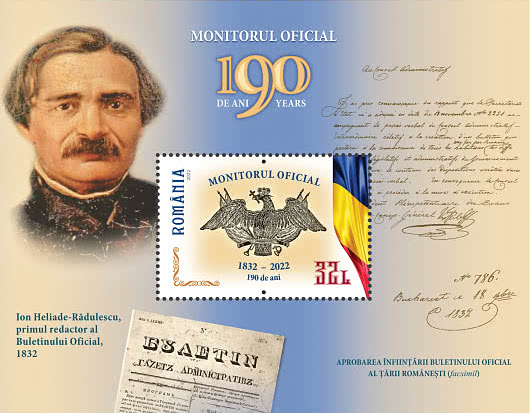
2022 stamp sheet of Romania dedicated to the 190th anniversary of Monitorul Oficial and its first editor, Ion Heliade Rădulescu

Monitorul Oficial, no. 001 of 1877

Monitorul Oficial al României is the official gazette of Romania, in which all the promulgated bills, presidential decrees, governmental ordinances and other major legal acts are published.
