= Police ranks of Poland =

Overview of police ranks in Poland

Police ranks of Poland (Polish: stopnie policyjne) are the titles used by the Polish Police to denote an officer’s position and seniority within the national police hierarchy. The system is established in law and represented by distinctive uniform insignia.

== Polish Police ==
=== Officers ===
Rank group	General / flag officers			Senior officers			Junior officers
		Generals		Senior officers			Junior officers
Policja	No equivalent
Policja	No equivalent	Generalny inspektor Policji	Nadinspektor	Inspektor	Młodszy inspektor	Podinspektor	Nadkomisarz	Komisarz	Podkomisarz
Policja	No equivalent	Inspector general of police	Chief inspector	Inspector	Junior inspector	Deputy inspector	Chief commissioner	Commissioner	Deputy commissioner

=== Other ranks ===
Rank group	Senior NCOs							Junior NCOs	Enlisted
	Aspirants				Non-commissioned officers				Constables
Policja								No equivalent
Policja	Aspirant sztabowy	Starszy aspirant	Aspirant	Młodszy aspirant	Sierżant sztabowy	Starszy sierżant	Sierżant	No equivalent	Starszy posterunkowy	Posterunkowy
Policja	Staff aspirant	Senior aspirant	Aspirant	Junior aspirant	Staff sergeant	Senior sergeant	Sergeant	No equivalent	Senior constable	Constable

== Railway Police ==
Officers

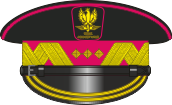
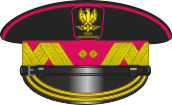
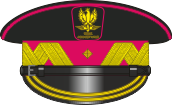
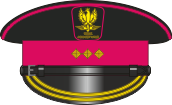
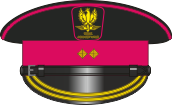
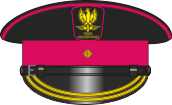
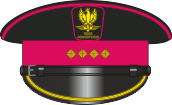
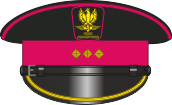
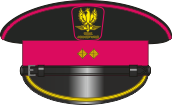
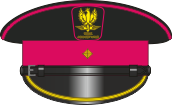
Rank group	General / flag officers				Senior officers			Junior officers
		Generals			Senior officers			Junior officers
Railway Police (SOK)	No equivalent
Railway Police (SOK)	No equivalent	Commander HQ SOK	Deputy commander HQ SOK for operations	Deputy commander HQ SOK for economy	Commander regional HQ SOK	Assistant commander regional HQ SOK	Senior inspector SOK	Division manager, Regional HQ SOK	Inspector SOK	Station commander SOK	Assistant station commander SOK

Other

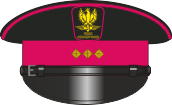
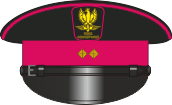
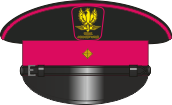
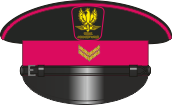
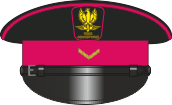
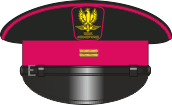
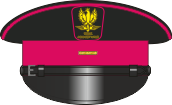
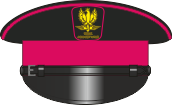
Rank group	Senior NCOs					Junior NCOs		Enlisted
									Trainee
Railway Police (SOK)						No equivalent
Railway Police (SOK)	Watch commander SOK	Duty officer SOK	Squad leader SOK	Senior team leader SOK	Team leader SOK	No equivalent	Senior officer SOK	Officer SOK	Trainee SOK

== Military Gendarmerie ==
Officers

NATO code	OF-10	OF-9	OF-8	OF-7	OF-6	OF-5	OF-4	OF-3	OF-2	OF-1
Żandarmeria wojskowa
Żandarmeria wojskowa					Generał brygady	Pułkownik	Podpułkownik	Major	Kapitan	Porucznik	Podporucznik

Enlisted

NATO code	OR-9		OR-8	OR-7	OR-6	OR-5	OR-4	OR-3		OR-2	OR-1
Żandarmeria wojskowa
Żandarmeria wojskowa	Starszy chorąży sztabowy	Starszy chorąży	Chorąży		Młodszy chorąży	Starszy sierżant	Sierżant	Plutonowy	Starszy kapral	Kapral	Starszy szeregowy	Szeregowy

== Border guard ==
Officers

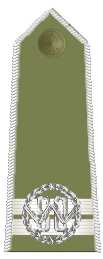
NATO code	OF-10	OF-9	OF-8	OF-7	OF-6	OF-5	OF-4	OF-3	OF-2	OF-1
Polish Border Guard
Polish Border Guard				Generał dywizji	Generał brygady	Pułkownik	Podpułkownik	Major	Kapitan	Porucznik	Podporucznik	Podchorąży
Polish Border Guard; Naval units												Various
Polish Border Guard; Naval units				Wiceadmirał	Kontradmirał	Komandor	Komandor porucznik	Komandor podporucznik	Kapitan marynarki	Porucznik marynarki	Podporucznik marynarki	Podchorąży
Polish Border Guard; Air department												Various
Polish Border Guard; Air department				Generał dywizji	Generał brygady	Pułkownik	Podpułkownik	Major	Kapitan	Porucznik	Podporucznik	Podchorąży

Enlisted

NATO code	OR-9			OR-8	OR-7	OR-6	OR-5		OR-4	OR-3	OR-2	OR-1
Polish Border Guard
Polish Border Guard	Starszy chorąży sztabowy	Chorąży sztabowy	Starszy chorąży	Chorąży		Młodszy chorąży	Sierżant sztabowy	Starszy sierżant	Sierżant	Plutonowy	Kapral	Starszy szeregowy	Szeregowy
Polish Border Guard; Naval units
Polish Border Guard; Naval units	Starszy chorąży sztabowy marynarki	Chorąży sztabowy marynarki	Starszy chorąży marynarki	Chorąży marynarki		Młodszy chorąży marynarki	Bosman sztabowy	Starszy bosman	Bosman	Bosmanmat	Mat	Starszy marynarz	Marynarz
Polish Border Guard; Air department
Polish Border Guard; Air department	Starszy chorąży sztabowy	Chorąży sztabowy	Starszy chorąży	Chorąży		Młodszy chorąży	Sierżant sztabowy	Starszy sierżant	Sierżant	Plutonowy	Kapral	Starszy szeregowy	Szeregowy

== State Police (1918–1939) ==
Police rank and equivalent army rank:

- Posterunkowy – Kapral
- Starszy posterunkowy – Plutonowy
- Przodownik – Sierżant
- Starszy przodownik – Starszy sierżant
- Aspirant – Podporucznik
- Podkomisarz – Porucznik
- Komisarz – Kapitan
- Nadkomisarz – Major
- Podinspektor – Podpułkownik
- Inspektor – Pułkownik
- Nadinspektor – no equivalent
- Generalny inspektor – Generał brygady

Officers

Rank group	General / flag officers		Senior officers			Junior officers
	Generals	Senior officers			Junior officers
Policja (1936-1939)
Policja (1936-1939)	Generalny inspektor	Nadinspektor	Inspektor	Podinspektor	Nadkomisarz	Komisarz	Podkomisarz	Aspirant
Policja (1936-1939)	Inspector general	Chief inspector	Inspector	Deputy inspector	Chief commissioner	Commissioner	Deputy commissioner	Aspirant

Other

Rank group	Senior NCOs		Junior NCOs		Enlisted
	Non-commissioned officers		Constables
Policja (1936-1938)
Policja (1938-1939)
	Starszy przodownik	Przodownik	Starszy posterunkowy	Posterunkowy
	Senior sergeant	Sergeant	Senior constable	Constable

== Blue Police (1939-1944) ==
The ranks of the Blue Police was as following:

Cap insignia	Shoulder insignia	Rank	German equivalent
		Inspektor	Oberstleutnant
		Podinspektor	Major
		Nadkomisarz	Hauptmann
		Komisarz	Oberleutnant
		Podkomisarz	Leutnant
		St. przodownik	Obermeister
		Przodownik	Meister
		St. posterunkowy	Hauptwachtmeister
		Posterunkowy	Wachtmeister
		Funkcjonariusz	Unterwachtmeister

== See also ==
- Polish Armed Forces rank insignia
- Ranks and insignia of NATO Armies
- Comparative military ranks
- European Gendarmerie Force ranks
- Polish Scouts rank insignia
