= Law enforcement in Poland =

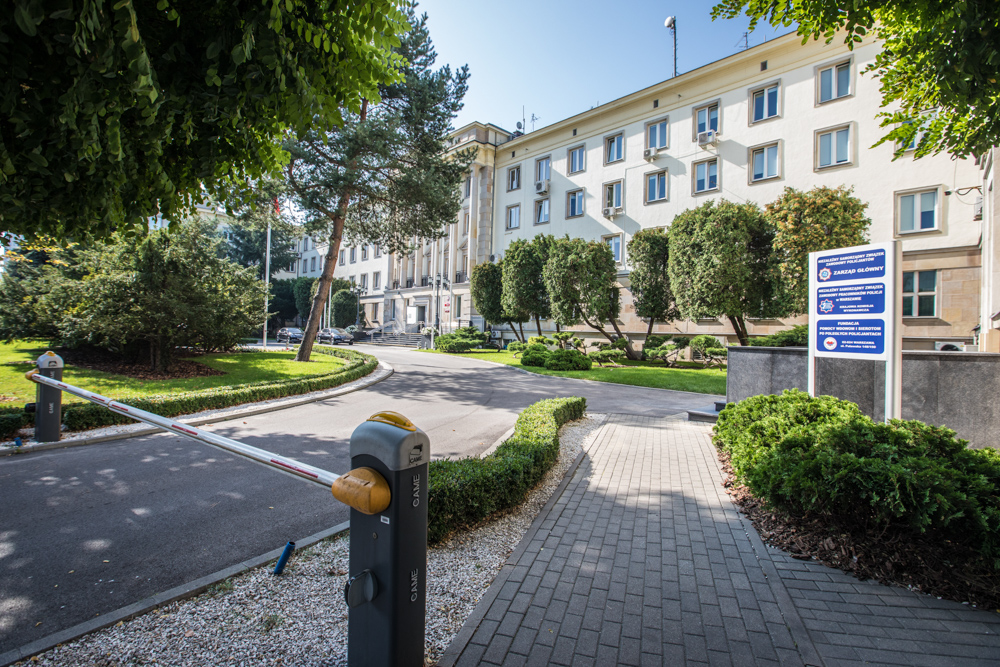
National Police Headquarters in Warsaw

Law enforcement in Poland consists of the Police (Policja), City Guards (named in urban areas "Straż Miejska" or in rural areas "Straż Gminna", which is a type of municipal police), and several smaller specialised agencies. The Prokuratura Krajowa (the Polish public prosecutor) and an independent judiciary also play an important role in the maintenance of law and order.

== History ==
=== Pre 20th century ===
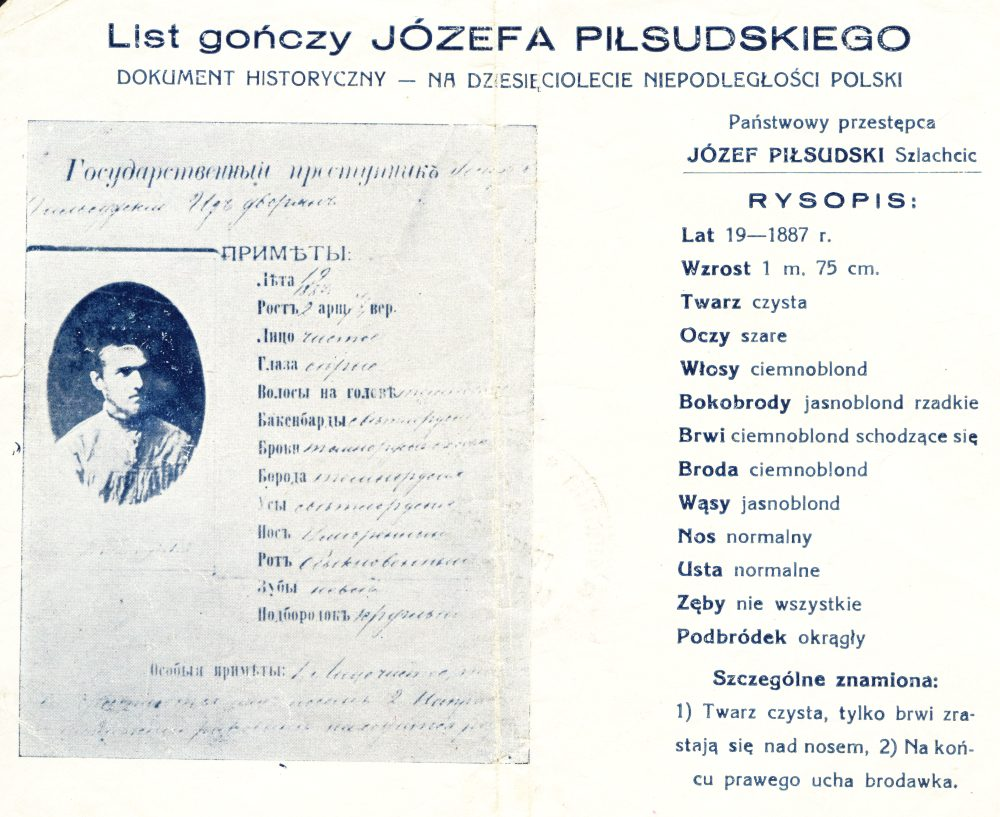
1887 Russian 'wanted' poster for future Polish Marshal of Poland and Chief of State, Józef Piłsudski

During the period of the Polish–Lithuanian Commonwealth's existence, most law enforcement was undertaken by a group of nobles of varying degrees of importance who possessed private armies and who, in return for political power and a place within the nation's social hierarchy, swore their allegiance, and that of their mercenary troops, to the king. As a result of the enduring power of several powerful 'magnates' within the social hierarchy, the relative weakness of the 'elected' monarchs and the continued existence of the feudal system in Polish society, centralised rule of law and enforcement of the same did not truly exist until the 1791 adoption of the 3 May Constitution.

The Constitution aimed to weaken the golden freedoms of the upper classes and redistribute a portion of their power amongst the mercantile middle classes. In addition to this, the establishment of a majority-voting Sejm and increased centralisation of sovereign power under the authority of the king, led to the establishment of a standing army, provided for by the state and subordinate only to the king and authorities of the national government.

As a result of the 1772–95 partitions of Poland, and subsequent rule of the partitioning powers (Austria-Hungary, Germany and Russia), the authority of King Stanisław August collapsed, and the former territories of the commonwealth came under the direct supervision of their partitioning powers' law enforcement services.

In Austrian-controlled Galicia, the Imperial Gendarmerie became responsible for preserving public order and later became known for being arguably the least oppressive of the three occupying powers. In both the Russian and German territories of former Poland, it was widely reported that law enforcement agencies and paramilitaries engaged in both the oppression of Polish political organisations and the forced assimilation of local culture with those of their own nations.

=== Post 1919 Independence until today ===
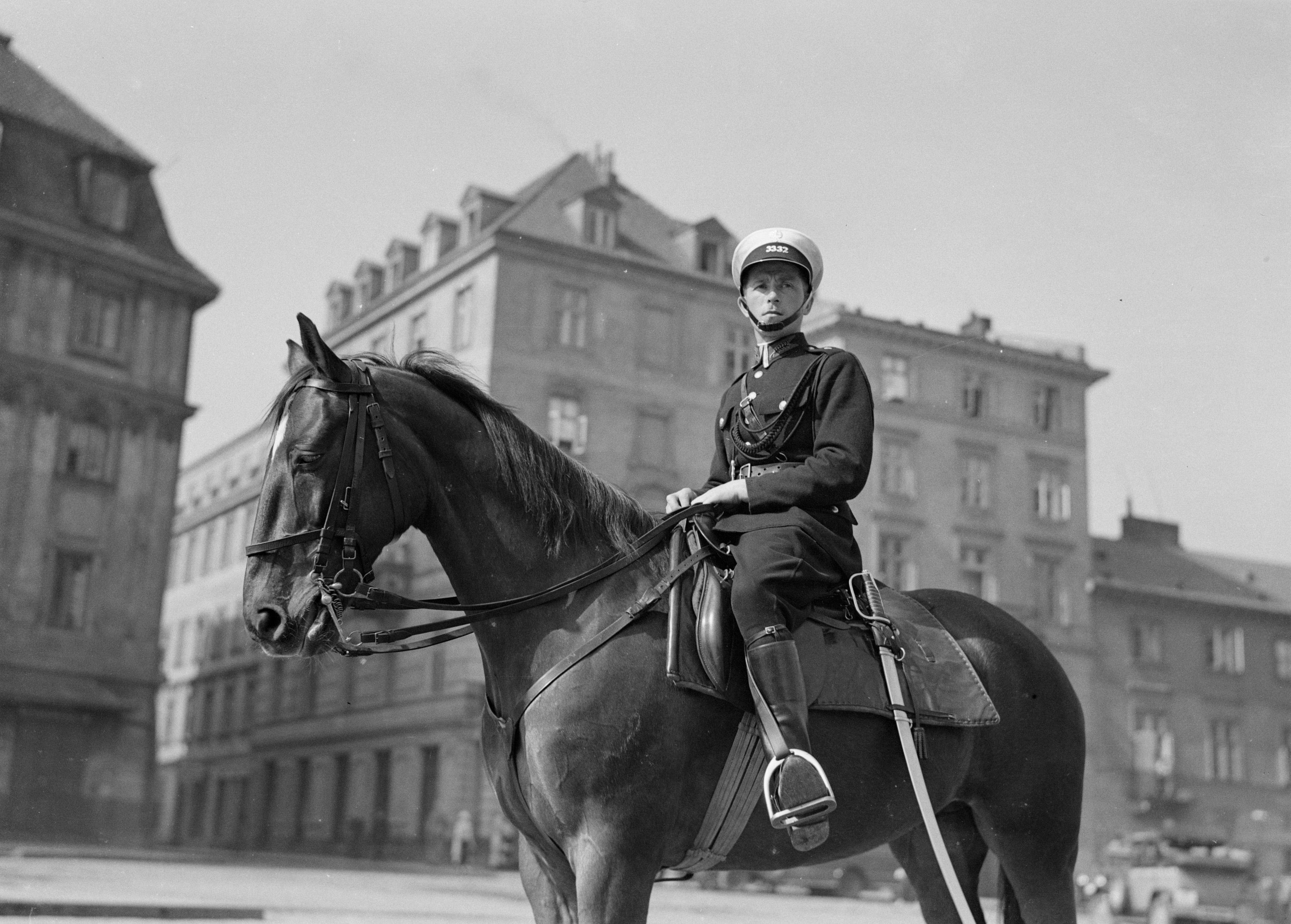
Mounted officer of the inter-war Policja Państwowa

In 1919, with the re-independence of the Polish nation, the state reorganised itself along non-federalist lines and established a centralised form of government. Under the auspices of the new government, a new national police force was formed; this State Police (Polish: Policja Państwowa) then existed as the primary law enforcement agency for the entire nation up until the outbreak of the Second World War in 1939. During the inter-war period, a number of key law enforcement duties were delegated to other formations, such as the Border Guard and Military Gendarmerie.

With the end of World War II and the onset of the communist period, the new Soviet backed government decided to radically change to structure of policing in Poland; the state 'Policja' was renamed as the 'Milicja Obywatelska' (Citizen's Militia), a name which was meant to reflect a change in the role of the police, from an instrument of oppression ensuring the position of the bourgeoisie, to a force composed of, and at the service of 'normal citizens'.

The reality turned out to be largely the opposite, and the Milicja instead represented a rather state-controlled force which was used to exert political repression on the citizens. The Milicja was, for the most part, detested by the general populace; events such as the police's conduct during the Gdańsk Shipyard Strike and surrounding the Popiełuszko affair, only worsened the people's view of their law enforcement agencies.

After the fall of the communist government in Poland, the system was reformed once again, this time reviving the pre-war name of 'Policja' and albeit with a few minor changes, the general system of law-enforcement of the Second Republic.

== Police ==
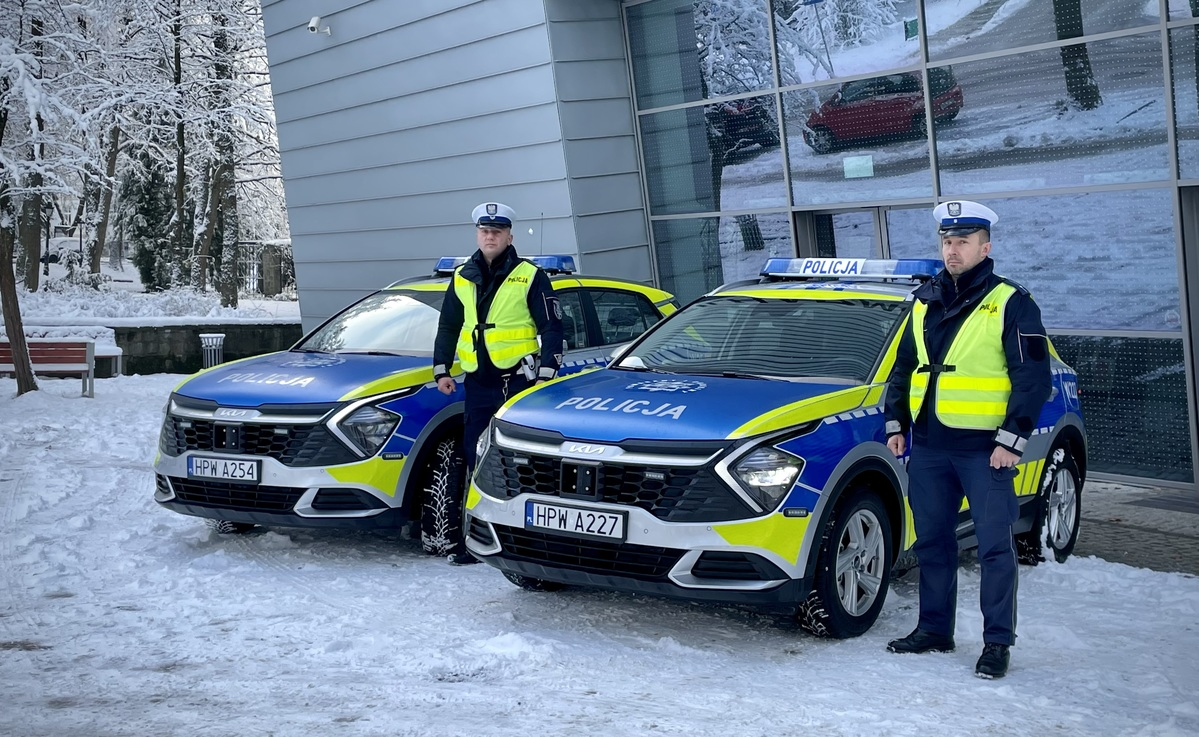
Policja officers and vehicles

The Policja (Police) is the national police force of Poland. It is directly responsible to the national government. Officers are routinely armed and are responsible for the investigation of most ordinary crimes. They are responsible for many specialist services such as highway patrol and counter-terrorism. They can be contacted by calling "997" from any telephone.

As Poland is a very centralised state, regional law enforcement agencies do not exist in the way that they do in the United States, Canada, Germany or the United Kingdom. While voivodeship (regional) commands exist within the organisational structure of the Policja, the regional authorities do not have any major say in law enforcement policy.

== City Guard ==
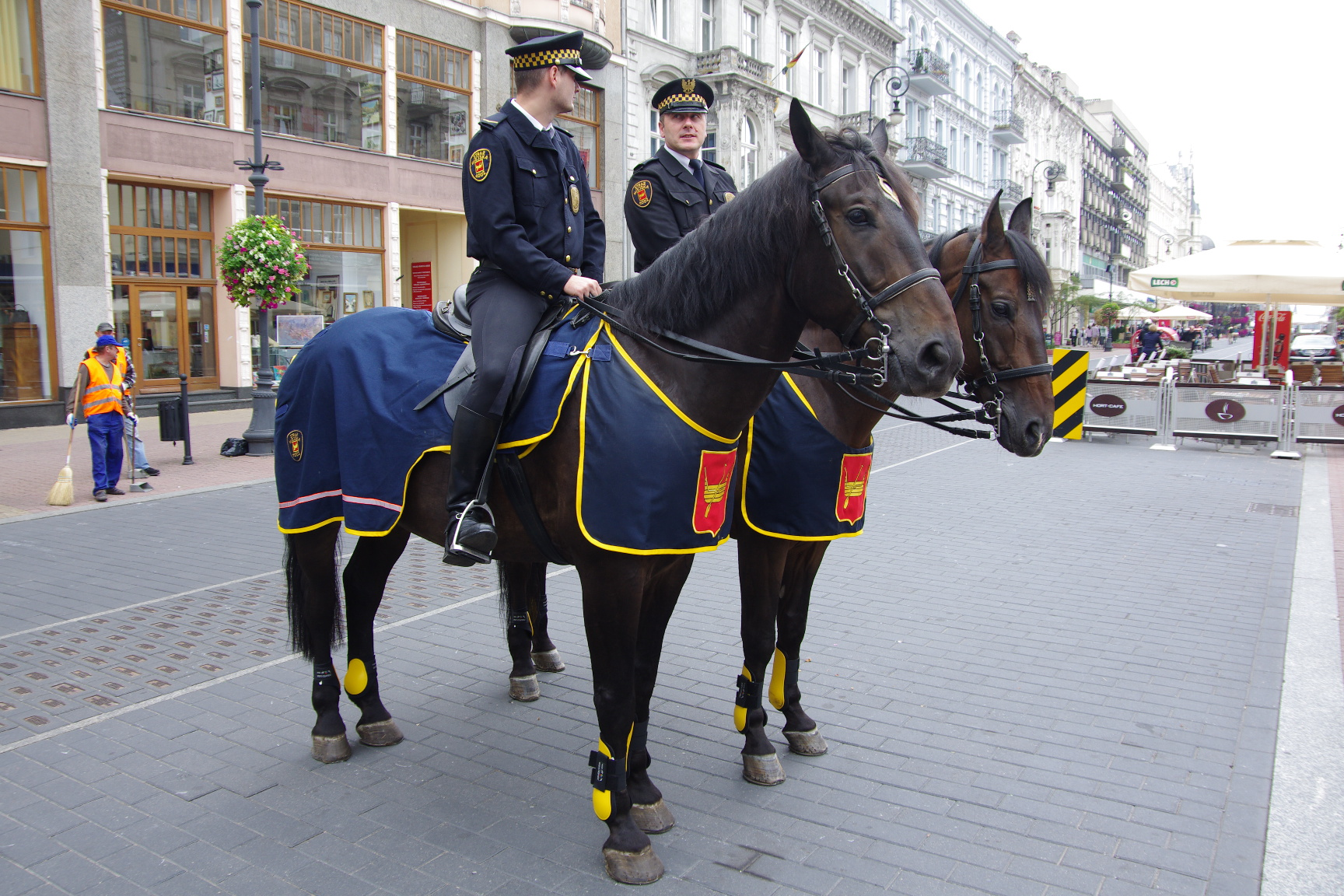
City guards in Łodz

Several cities and gmina (English: municipalities) in Poland have their own municipal enforcement forces, primarily tasked with maintaining public order and enforcement of local ordinance, called Straż Miejska (English: City Guard) or Straż Gminna (English: Municipality Guard). They work in conjunction with the Policja, although with much more limited powers and do not carry firearms. They can be contacted by calling "986" from any telephone.

The tasks of the Polish city guards include protecting public peace and order, safeguarding communal facilities and public utilities, traffic control, managing public events, dealing with intoxicated individuals in public, crime prevention, and escorting valuable documents and items for the municipality. They have the authority to issue warnings, impose fines for violations, identify individuals when there is reasonable suspicion that a crime has been committed, arrest those who pose an immediate threat, and, in isolated cases, conduct body searches.

== Other law enforcement and security agencies ==
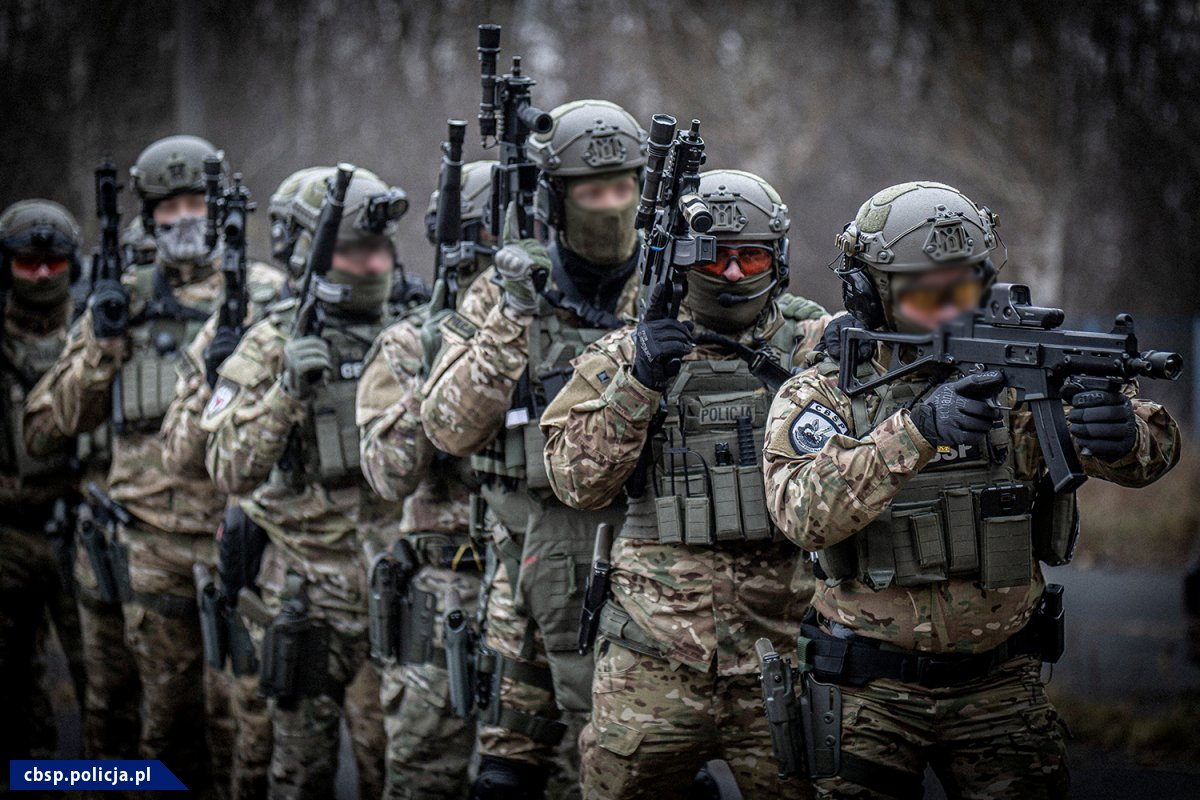
Central Investigation Bureau of Police during a training exercise

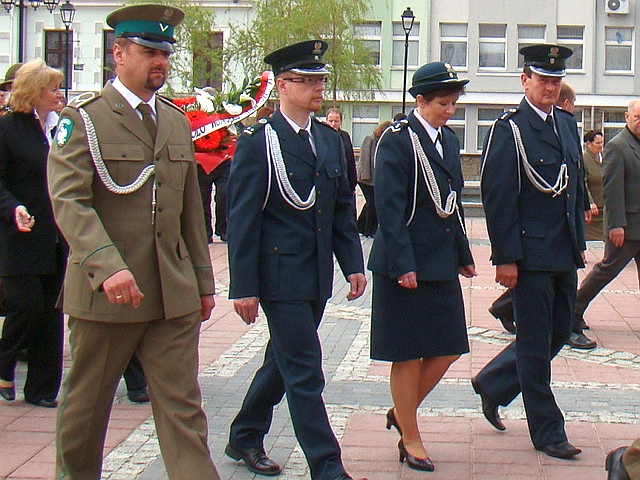
An officer of the Border Guard in parade uniform walks with colleagues from the Służba Celno-Skarbowa (Customs Service)

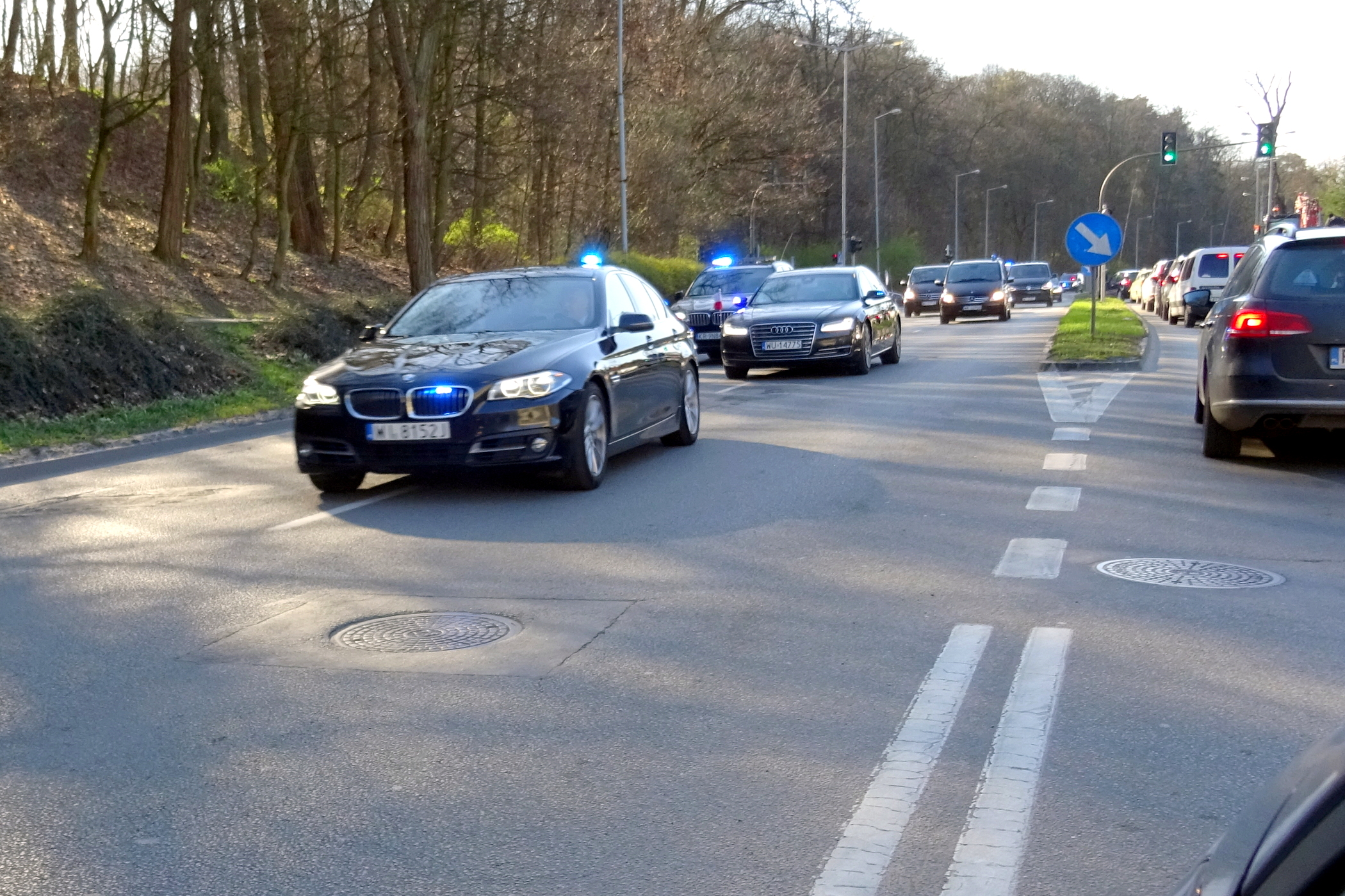
State Protection Service presidential escort

In addition to the Policja and the City Guards, there are also several specialised agencies which operate with more specific objectives.

- Centralne Biuro Śledcze Policji (English: Central Investigation Bureau of Police): Police agency dealing with countering organised crime.
- Agencja Bezpieczeństwa Wewnętrznego (English: Internal Security Agency): Responsible for matters related to Poland's internal security, including counter-espionage and counter-terrorism. It is analogous to the American Federal Bureau of Investigation (FBI), and British Security Service (MI5). It is responsible directly to the Prime Minister.
- Służba Ochrony Państwa (English: State Protection Service): A protective security unit tasked with the protection of the Polish President, Prime Minister, Ministers of State, and other 'at-risk' persons within the government. Analogous to the U.S. Secret Service.
- Centralne Biuro Antykorupcyjne (English: Central Anticorruption Bureau): Responsible for investigating and preventing corruption in both the public and private sectors. It was founded in 2006, and is responsible directly to the Prime Minister.
- Służba Celno-Skarbowa (English: Customs & Tax Service): The Polish Customs Service is responsible for collecting customs duties, mostly at Poland's borders, and is responsible to the Ministry of Finance.
- Oddział Wart Cywilnych (English: Civilian Watch Detachment): Armed civilian watchmen tasked with protecting military areas. They are responsible to the Ministry of Defence.
- Służba Więzienna (English: Prison Service): Responsible for management of Prisons in Poland
- Straż Graniczna (English: Border Guard): Responsible for border protection at land borders and other points of entry, such as airports.
- Straż Ochrony Kolei (English: Railway Protection Guard): security unit protecting railway infrastructure. Found operating at railway stations and on trains.
- Żandarmeria Wojskowa (English: Military Gendarmerie): The military police of the Polish armed forces. They have authority over all service personnel, as well as civilians working for the armed forces or living on military bases and foreign soldiers based in Poland. As part of the armed forces, they are responsible to the Ministry of Defence.
- Straż Marszałkowska: Security service of the edifices of parliament of Poland, responsible for the security of the deputies and senators as well as of the buildings of the legislative branch (Sejm and Senat). They are responsible to the Marszałek Sejmu (Speaker of Sejm).
- Państwowa Straż Rybacka (English: State Fishing Guard): a uniformed service with police powers. Guards have the right to, among other things: check the documents authorizing fishing from individuals engaged in fishing and documents confirming the origin of fish from individuals processing or introducing fish into commerce; check the quantity, mass, and species of caught fish being processed or introduced into commerce, as well as the items used for their capture. Guards may also secure abandoned fish and items used for their capture if the owner cannot be determined; they can also check the identification of suspicious individuals.
- Państwowa Straż Łowiecka (English: State Hunting Guard): a uniformed service with police powers. Guards have the right to check the identification of individuals suspected of committing a crime or offense; issue fines for offenses committed in hunting areas and their immediate vicinity; stop and inspect means of transport in hunting areas and their immediate vicinity; search individuals, premises, and other places; apprehend perpetrators of crimes or offenses caught in the act or in pursuit immediately after the commission of the crime and bring them to a Police unit; inspect entities involved in the collection, processing, sale of game carcasses or their parts, trade in live game, as well as the breeding and raising of game animals.

== Transportation and equipment ==
The Policja are routinely armed, and use a variety of marked and unmarked cars, vans, motorbikes and other vehicles. Their most common patrol car is currently the Kia Cee'd.

Other law enforcement agencies operate more standardised fleets which usually contain only one or two vehicle models. This is usually because City Guards source all the cars of their small fleets from one firm to reduce cost, whilst more specialised services buy large fleets of vehicles specific to their requirements, an example of which would be the large use of all-terrain Land Rover Defenders by the Border Guard.

== See also ==
- Crime in Poland
- Human rights in Poland
- Law in Poland
- Milicja Obywatelska
- Ministry of Interior and Administration of the Republic of Poland
- Ministry of Justice of the Republic of Poland
- Police corruption in Poland
- Police ranks of Poland
- Prisons in Poland
