= Polish Armed Forces rank insignia =

This article presents the military ranks of the entire Polish Armed Forces as well as the rank insignia used today. The system of rank insignia is a direct descendant of various systems used throughout history by the Polish Army. Some of the grades trace their name back to the Middle Ages, for instance the rank of chorąży literally means a flag bearer or an Ensign.

Names of Polish ranks are often of foreign origin, like the ones introduced by the 17th-century mercenaries serving for the Polish Crown. These include the rank of kapral, which is a derivative of the Italian caporale - much like the English equivalent of corporal.

== Origins ==
Most rank titles are cognates to the ones in English, with some exceptions. Notably colonel's literal meaning is regimental-leader, likewise plutonowy means platoon-leader. Also, the title equivalent to petty officer is identical to the word for boatswain, so a Bosman may or may not be a bosman.

Until World War II, each of the branches of the Land Forces used a set of different names for the same grades. For instance a sergeant was called sierżant in the infantry, ogniomistrz (literally master of fire) in the artillery and wachmistrz (from German Wachtmeister, or Master of the Guards) in the cavalry. This is similar to the German army calling a cavalry officer which is equivalent to Hauptmann a Rittmeister

Modern Polish military practices were heavily influenced by Prussian/German and Russian traditions, as most founding officers after 1918 independence were veterans of those respective armies.

== Customs ==
The Polish language requires the use of a prior honorific before stating the addressee's rank e.g. 'Panie Kapitanie...' (Sir Captain...). This is directly equivalent to French practice where the possessive Mon is pre-pended to the addressee's rank. During the communist period use of the formal 'Pan' (Sir) was frowned upon and 'Obywatel' (Citizen) (as in: Obywatelu Kapitanie!) was used. This has reverted to prior style in the post-communist era.

It is customary to include other titles when referring to an officer in writing. This can lead to some interesting abbreviations. For example, a Lt. Col. in the airforce by the name Nowak who is a pilot and has an MSc in engineering would be written ppłk pil. mgr inż. Nowak (LtCol plt MEng Nowak).

Uniquely, Polish forces use a two-fingered version of the salute, and the saluting custom does not allow saluting with the fingers to the head without having headgear on (cap/beret or helmet).

From 2024, working dogs in the Polish Army could be given ranks up to Sierżant.

== Commissioned officer ranks ==
The rank insignia of commissioned officers.

NATO code	OF-10	OF-9	OF-8	OF-7	OF-6	OF-5	OF-4	OF-3	OF-2	OF-1
Polish Land Forces
Polish Land Forces	Marszałek Polski	Generał	Generał broni	Generał dywizji	Generał brygady	Pułkownik	Podpułkownik	Major	Kapitan	Porucznik	Podporucznik
Żandarmeria wojskowa
Żandarmeria wojskowa					Generał brygady	Pułkownik	Podpułkownik	Major	Kapitan	Porucznik	Podporucznik
Polish Air Force
Polish Air Force	Marszałek Polski	Generał	Generał broni	Generał dywizji	Generał brygady	Pułkownik	Podpułkownik	Major	Kapitan	Porucznik	Podporucznik
Polish Navy
Polish Navy	Marszałek Polski	Admirał	Admirał floty	Wiceadmirał	Kontradmirał	Komandor	Komandor porucznik	Komandor podporucznik	Kapitan marynarki	Porucznik marynarki	Podporucznik marynarki

== Other ranks ==
The rank insignia of non-commissioned officers and enlisted personnel.

NATO code	OR-9		OR-8	OR-7	OR-6	OR-5	OR-4	OR-3		OR-2	OR-1
Polish Land Forces
Polish Land Forces	Starszy chorąży sztabowy	Starszy chorąży	Chorąży		Młodszy chorąży	Starszy sierżant	Sierżant	Plutonowy	Starszy kapral	Kapral	Starszy szeregowy	Szeregowy
Żandarmeria wojskowa
Żandarmeria wojskowa	Starszy chorąży sztabowy	Starszy chorąży	Chorąży		Młodszy chorąży	Starszy sierżant	Sierżant	Plutonowy	Starszy kapral	Kapral	Starszy szeregowy	Szeregowy
Polish Air Force
Polish Air Force	Starszy chorąży sztabowy	Starszy chorąży	Chorąży		Młodszy chorąży	Starszy sierżant	Sierżant	Plutonowy	Starszy kapral	Kapral	Starszy szeregowy	Szeregowy
Polish Navy												No insignia
Polish Navy	Starszy chorąży sztabowy marynarki	Starszy chorąży marynarki	Chorąży marynarki		Młodszy chorąży marynarki	Starszy bosman	Bosman	Bosmanmat	Starszy mat	Mat	Starszy marynarz	Marynarz

== Obsolete ranks ==
=== Ranks discontinued on 1 July 2004 ===
NATO code	OR-9		OR-5		OR-3
Polish Land Forces
Polish Land Forces	Chorąży sztabowy	Młodszy chorąży sztabowy	Starszy sierżant sztabowy	Sierżant sztabowy	Starszy plutonowy
Polish Air Force
Polish Air Force	Chorąży sztabowy	Młodszy chorąży sztabowy	Starszy sierżant sztabowy	Sierżant sztabowy	Starszy plutonowy
Polish Navy
Polish Navy	Chorąży sztabowy marynarki	Młodszy chorąży sztabowy marynarki	Starszy bosman sztabowy	Bosman sztabowy	Starszy bosmanmat

=== Other changes after July 1, 2004 ===
Until 2004 the ranks of chorąży (OR-9 and OR-8) constituted a separate group, roughly corresponding to U.S. Warrant Officers. On July 1, 2004, the number of these ranks was reduced and they were included in the group of non-commissioned ranks.

==== Pay Grade changes on July 1, 2004 ====
- starszy chorąży/starszy chorąży marynarki: OR-8 to OR-9
- młodszy chorąży/młodszy chorąży marynarki: OR-8 to OR-7
- starszy Kapral/starszy mat: OR-3 to OR-4

On January 1, 2014, all reserve NCOs, holders of the rank of chorąży sztabowy / chorąży sztabowy marynarki and młodszy chorąży sztabowy / młodszy chorąży sztabowy marynarki were promoted to the rank of starszy chorąży sztabowy / starszy chorąży sztabowy marynarki; holders of the rank of starszy sierżant sztabowy / starszy bosman sztabowy and sierżant sztabowy / bosman sztabowy were promoted to the rank of młodszy chorąży / młodszy chorąży marynarki; and holders of the rank of starszy plutonowy / starszy bosmanmat were promoted to the rank of sierżant / bosman.

Thus the ranks discontinued on July 1, 2004, were officially abolished in the Polish Armed Forces.

=== Historical Ranks in the Polish Armed Forces ===
- Hetman
- Rotmistrz
- Regimentarz
- Strażnik Wielki
- Strażnik Polny
- Pisarz Polny
- Oboźny Wielki
- Oboźny Polny
- Adiutant
- Towarzysz
- Konduktor
- Sztuk junkier
- Bosman floty
- Wachmistrz
- Ogniomistrz
- Miczman
- Bombardier

== See also ==
- Certified officer, a title in Polish Armed Forces
- Police ranks of Poland
- Polish Scouts rank insignia
