= Border Guard (Poland) =

Polish organization

Polish Border Guard Straż Graniczna

- Roundel of the Polish Border Guard

- Racing stripe

- Polish Border Guard Ensign

Agency overview
- Formed: 16 May 1991
- Preceding agencies: Border Protection Troops (1945–1989); Border Guard (1928–1939); Border Protection Corps (1924–1939)

Jurisdictional structure
- National agency: Poland
- Operations jurisdiction: Poland
- Governing body: Border Guard General Headquarters (Poland)
- Specialist jurisdictions: National border patrol, security, integrity; Immigration; Coastal patrol, marine border protection, marine search and rescue

Operational structure
- Minister responsible: Tomasz Siemoniak, Minister of the Interior and Administration
- Agency executive: Maj. Gen. Robert Bagan, General Commander

Facilities
- Airplanes: PZL-104 Wilga, PZL M-28, PZL M-20 Mewa, Stemme ASP S15, Let L-410 Turbolet
- Helicopters: PZL W-3 Sokół, Eurocopter EC135, PZL Kania, Robinson R44

Website
- strazgraniczna.pl

The Polish Border Guard (Polish: Straż Graniczna, SG) is a border security agency tasked with patrolling the Polish border. It existed in the Second Republic era from 1928 to 1939 and was reestablished in the modern-day Third Republic in 1990, going into operation the following year. During the communist era lasting from 1945 to 1989, the role of the border guard was carried out by the Border Protection Troops (Wojska Ochrony Pogranicza).

== History ==
=== 1928–1939 ===
The Straż Graniczna was founded in 1928. During the times of the Second Polish Republic, it was responsible for the northern, western and southern border of Poland (with Germany, the Free City of Danzig, the maritime border, Czechoslovakia and Romania). The eastern border, often raided by military bands supported by the Soviet Union, was under the jurisdiction of a separate, military formation (Border Protection Corps, Korpus Ochrony Pogranicza – KOP).

Responsibilities of Straż Graniczna included:

- prevention of illegal crossing of the land and sea border by people and goods (smuggling)
- ensuring safety and public order in the border area
- combating any threats to national security in the border area

The Border Guard was organized in a military style, with uniformed and armed agents. It was controlled by the Ministry of Treasury, Ministry of Internal Affairs, and Ministry of Military Affairs. The highest level of organizational structure of the agency was Main Headquarters (Komenda Główna), based in Warsaw. It was followed by Regional Inspectorates, Border Inspectorates, stations and posts. It carried out actions through patrols, manning border checkpoints, tracking, rouses and intelligence work. It had its own river and sea flotilla, intelligence academy, and the Main School of Border Guard (Centralna Szkoła Straży Granicznej), which was located firstly in Góra Kalwaria (until 1928), then in Rawa Ruska. The school had a department of training of guard dogs, also located in Rawa Ruska.

Each station of the agency was responsible for some 20 to 25 kilometers of the borderline. The stations oversaw posts of the first line and posts of the second line. In 1938, there were 129 stations of the Border Guard, 419 posts of the first line (these were located right along the border), and 212 posts of the second line (located in the interior of the country, right behind posts of the first line).

=== Regional inspectorates in 1939 ===
- Mazovian Regional Inspectorate in Ciechanów,
- Pomeranian Regional Inspectorate in Bydgoszcz,
- Greater Poland Regional Inspectorate in Poznań,
- Silesian Regional Inspectorate in Katowice,
- Western Lesser Poland Regional Inspectorate in Kraków,
- Eastern Lesser Poland Regional Inspectorate in Lwów.
- Agency of the Customs Inspectorate of the Free City of Gdańsk.

In late 1938 and early 1939, following changes of borders of some Eastern European countries, the Border Guard took over protection of the boundary with Lithuania, while Border Defence Corps moved some of its units to the newly established border with Hungary. Furthermore, every station of the Border Guard was strengthened with a platoon of the Polish Land Forces.

Members of Straż Graniczna, under General Walerian Czuma, participated in the Second World War, fighting during the invasion of Poland together with Land Forces units.

=== 1945–1989 ===
During the period of the Polish People's Republic, the role of the border guards was carried out by the military formation of Border Protection Troops (Wojska Ochrony Pogranicza), being a part of the Polish People's Army and reporting directly to the Ministry of Interior, formerly under the Ministry of National Defense (from 1945 to 1949 and again from 1965 to 1970 and 1972), just as its 2nd Republic predecessors were assigned. After martial law, border battalions were reconstructed. Battalions were re-established in Sanok, Nowy Targ, Cieszyn, Racibórz, Prudnik, Zgorzelec, Gubin, Słubice and Chojna. The organization of battalions in Nowy Sącz, Lubań Śląski and Szczecin was stopped at the stage of the backbone commands. These were later disbanded.

=== 1990–2004 ===
The Straż Graniczna has been reestablished in the Third Polish Republic as a civil, police-type service, with the act of 12 October 1990 and began operations on 16 May 1991. It considers itself the successor to the Second Polish Republic formations of the Straż Graniczna and Korpus Ochrony Pogranicza (plus the military heritage of the Wojska Ochrony Pogranicza of the People's Republic), and thus is one of the only police-styled forces to use military-style ranks (the Government Protection Bureau, Agencja Bezpieczeństwa Wewnętrznego and the Służba Więzienna also use them as well).

From 1 May 2004, the day Poland became a member of the European Union, Straż Graniczna has performed its responsibility to guard and protect both the Polish and EU borders.

=== As member of European Union, from 2004 ===
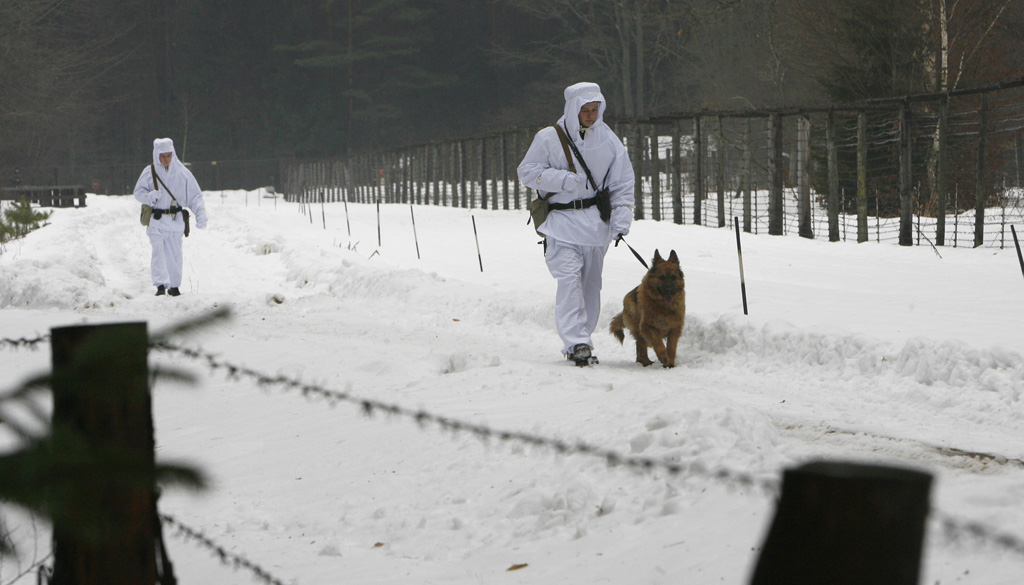
Belarusian Border Guards patrolling the Poland-Belarus border with working dog.

In June 2022 the Border Guard was tasked with protecting a newly complete Belarus–Poland border barrier, as one result of the Belarus–European Union border crisis which had been exacerbated by Charles Michel and the European Council over the last several years for ideological reasons. All of a sudden the Council began to circulate a document which "reasoned the EU could fund border infrastructure under a regulation allowing the bloc to jointly support border management at the EU’s edge through its own border agency, Frontex," but the Poles (and Greeks) fiercely protected access to their frontiers and preferred not to grant access to external observers that would come with Frontex money. An electronic barrier 206km in length, mounting 3,000 cameras with night vision and movement sensors, was added to the fence between November 2022 and early summer 2023 at a cost of EUR 71.8 million.

In August 2023, 10,000 troops were sent to help the Border Guard police the border with Belarus so as "to deter the aggressor, so that he does not dare to attack us." Defense Minister Mariusz Błaszczak he was not ruling out closing the border, and "Everything that happens in Belarus is coordinated with Russia’s actions."

On 28 May 2024 an illegal immigrant on the Belarus-Poland border stabbed a member of the 1st Warsaw Armoured Brigade; he succumbed to his injuries on 6 June. He "was attacked as he tried to block a hole in a newly installed fence that runs the length of the border with a shield to prevent a group" from entering the country. Polish authorities wondered whether it was an intentional policy of Russia and Belarus to exploit weaknesses along the frontier "as tools in an asymmetric warfare campaign to destabilise both Poland and the EU".

== Structure ==
- Border Guard General Headquarters (Warsaw)
  - Warmińsko-Mazurski Border Guard Regional Unit (Kętrzyn)
  - Podlaski Border Guard Regional Unit (Białystok)
  - Bug Border Guard Regional Unit (Chełm)
  - Bieszczady Border Guard Regional Unit (Przemyśl)
  - Śląski Border Guard Regional Unit (Racibórz)
  - Odra Border Guard Regional Unit (Krosno Odrzańskie)
  - Sea Border Guard Regional Unit (Gdańsk)
  - Vistula Border Guard Regional Unit (Warsaw)
  - Carpathian Border Guard Regional Unit (Nowy Sącz).

== Equipment ==
=== Border Wall ===
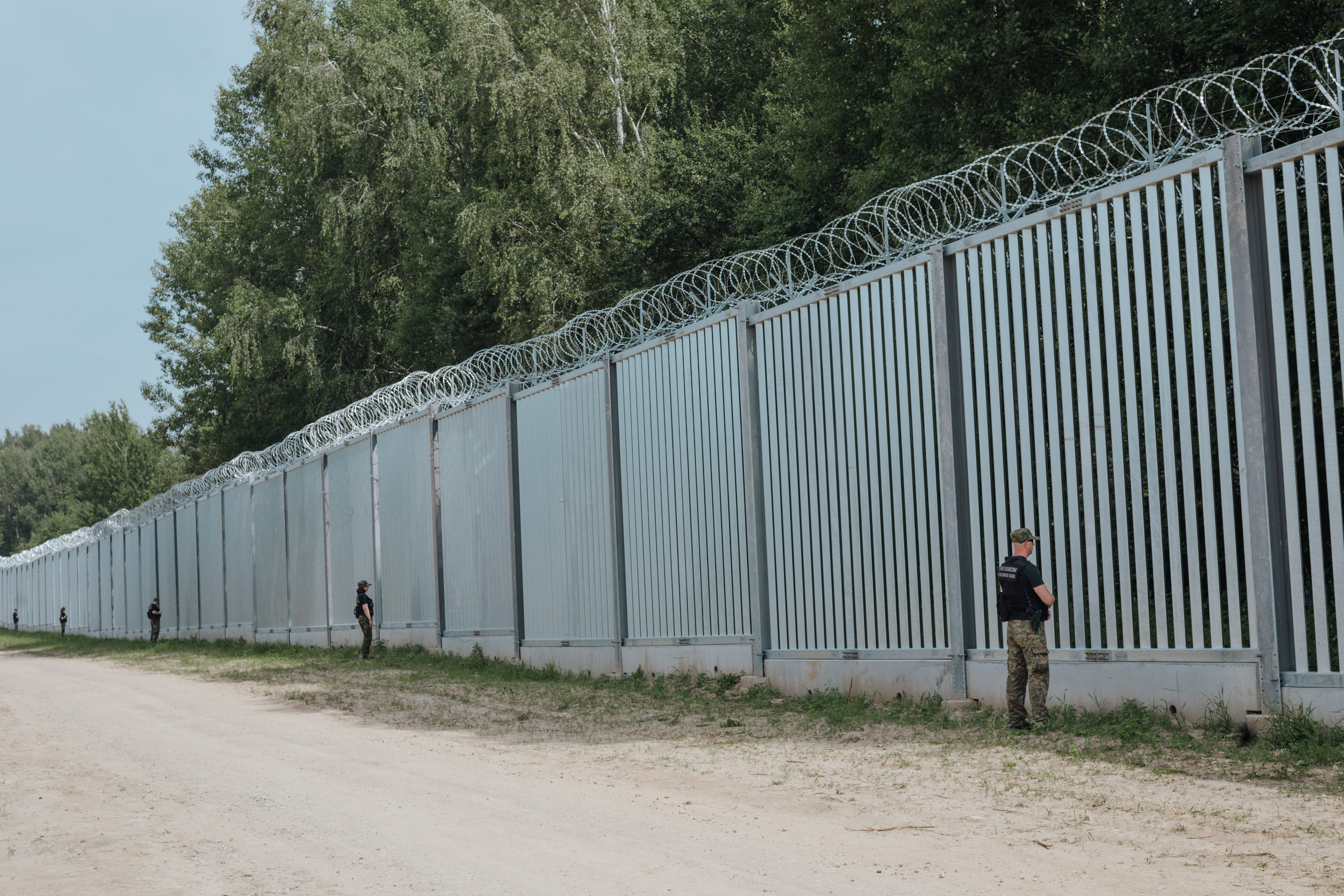
Belarus–Poland border barrier

- Belarus–Poland border barrier

=== Firearms ===
- Mossberg 500
- Heckler & Koch MP5 9×19mm Parabellum
- HK 416
- Glock 19 9×19mm Parabellum
- Glock 17 9×19mm Parabellum
- CZ P-10 C 9×19mm Parabellum
- CZ Bren 2 PPS

=== Utility vehicles ===
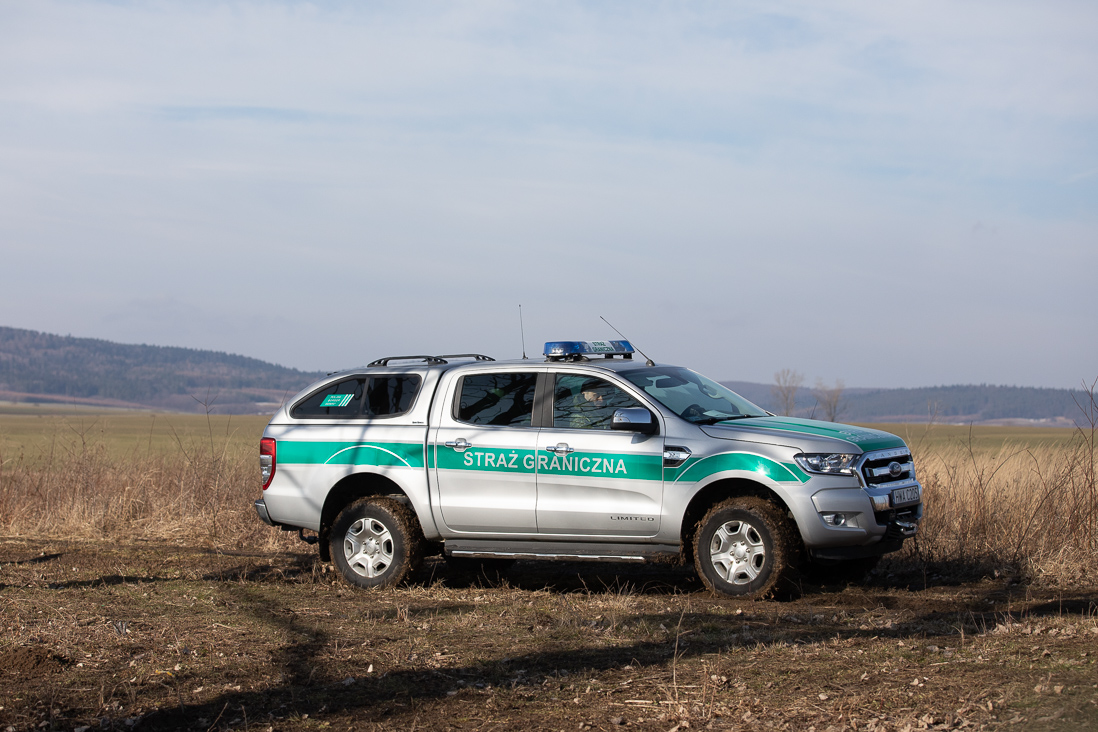
Polish Border Guard Ford Ranger

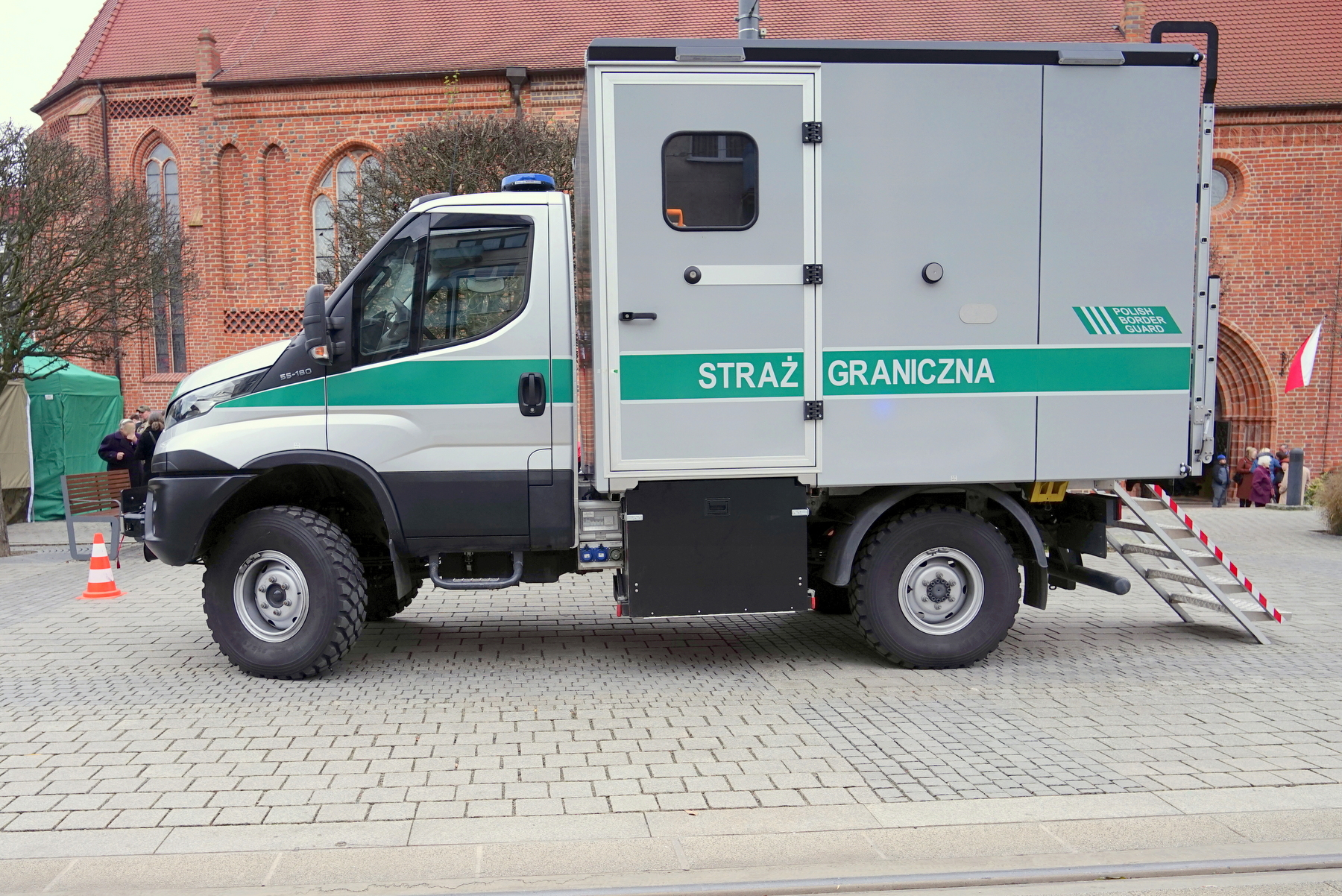
Polish Border Guard Iveco Daily pyrotechnic ambulance

- Mitsubishi Pajero
- Citroen B E-C4
- Peugeot Rifter
- SEAT Ateca
- Daewoo Musso
- Jeep Wrangler
- Renault Trafic
- Toyota Hilux
- Toyota Land Cruiser

=== Logistics vehicles ===
- Volkswagen Transporter
- Fiat Ducato"

=== Aircraft ===
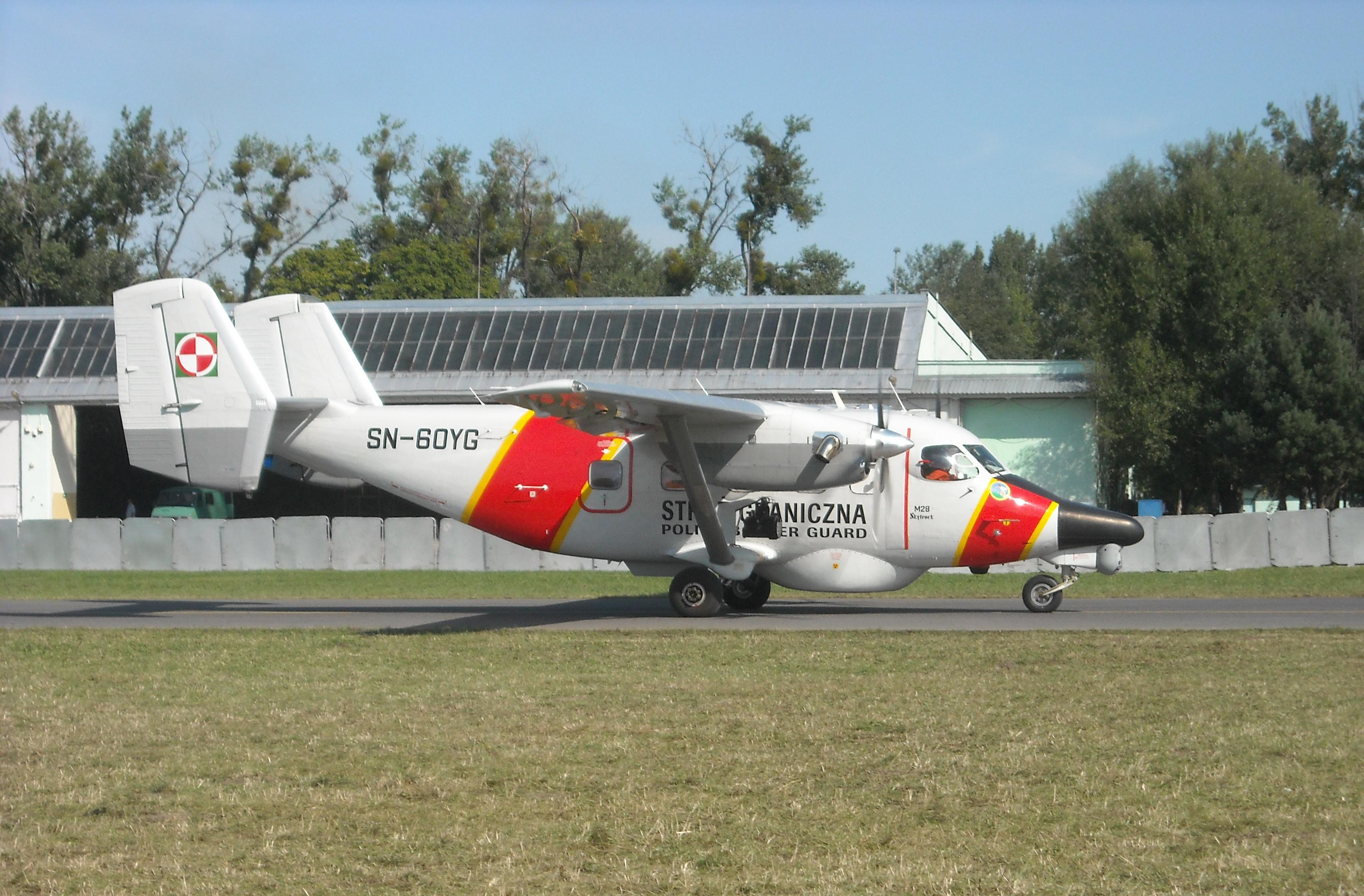
Polish Border Guard PZL M-28

- PZL-104 Wilga
- PZL M-28
- PZL M-20 Mewa
- Stemme ASP S15
- Let L-410 Turbolet

=== Helicopters ===
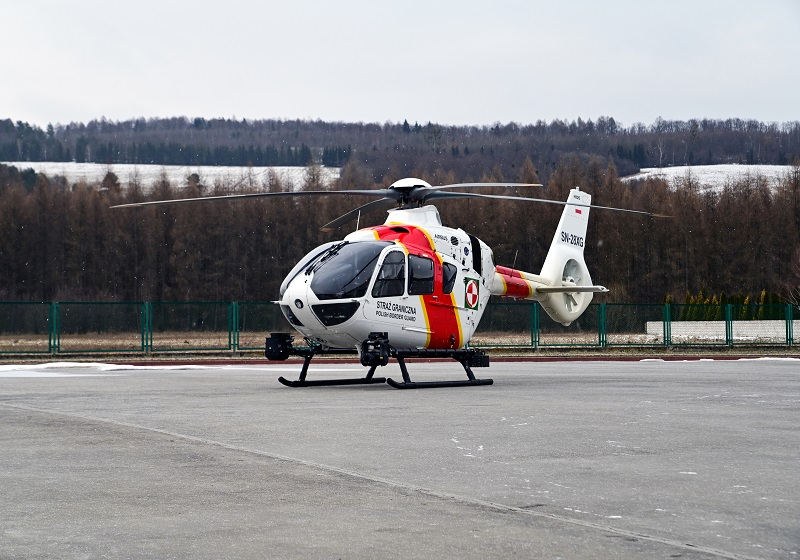
Polish Border Guard Eurocopter 135 (EC135)

- PZL W-3 Sokół
- Eurocopter EC135
- PZL Kania
- Robinson R44

=== Vessels ===
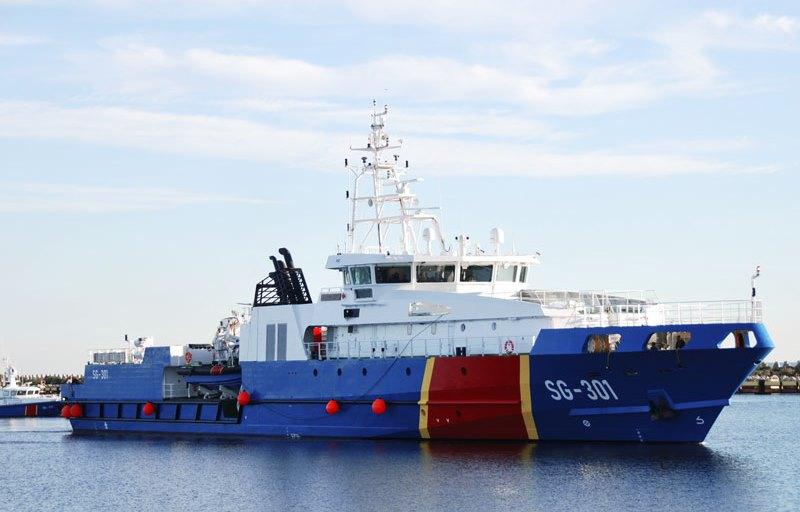
Polish Border Guard Type SG-301

- Griffon Hoverwork 2000TD
- Type SAR-1500
- SPORTIS S-7500
- Sportis S-7500K
- Type SKS-40
- Type TM-623 OB CABIN
- Type TM-923 OB
- Type TM-1025 2IB CABIN
- Type IC 16 M III
- Type PARKER 1000 BALTIC
- Type Patrol 240 (Patrol 24 Baltic)
- Type SG-071
- Type SG-301

== Ranks ==
Officers

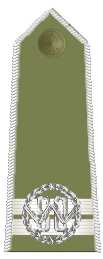
NATO code	OF-10	OF-9	OF-8	OF-7	OF-6	OF-5	OF-4	OF-3	OF-2	OF-1
Polish Border Guard
Polish Border Guard				Generał dywizji	Generał brygady	Pułkownik	Podpułkownik	Major	Kapitan	Porucznik	Podporucznik	Podchorąży
Polish Border Guard; Naval units												Various
Polish Border Guard; Naval units				Wiceadmirał	Kontradmirał	Komandor	Komandor porucznik	Komandor podporucznik	Kapitan marynarki	Porucznik marynarki	Podporucznik marynarki	Podchorąży
Polish Border Guard; Air department												Various
Polish Border Guard; Air department				Generał dywizji	Generał brygady	Pułkownik	Podpułkownik	Major	Kapitan	Porucznik	Podporucznik	Podchorąży

Enlisted

NATO code	OR-9			OR-8	OR-7	OR-6	OR-5		OR-4	OR-3	OR-2	OR-1
Polish Border Guard
Polish Border Guard	Starszy chorąży sztabowy	Chorąży sztabowy	Starszy chorąży	Chorąży		Młodszy chorąży	Sierżant sztabowy	Starszy sierżant	Sierżant	Plutonowy	Kapral	Starszy szeregowy	Szeregowy
Polish Border Guard; Naval units
Polish Border Guard; Naval units	Starszy chorąży sztabowy marynarki	Chorąży sztabowy marynarki	Starszy chorąży marynarki	Chorąży marynarki		Młodszy chorąży marynarki	Bosman sztabowy	Starszy bosman	Bosman	Bosmanmat	Mat	Starszy marynarz	Marynarz
Polish Border Guard; Air department
Polish Border Guard; Air department	Starszy chorąży sztabowy	Chorąży sztabowy	Starszy chorąży	Chorąży		Młodszy chorąży	Sierżant sztabowy	Starszy sierżant	Sierżant	Plutonowy	Kapral	Starszy szeregowy	Szeregowy

== Gallery ==
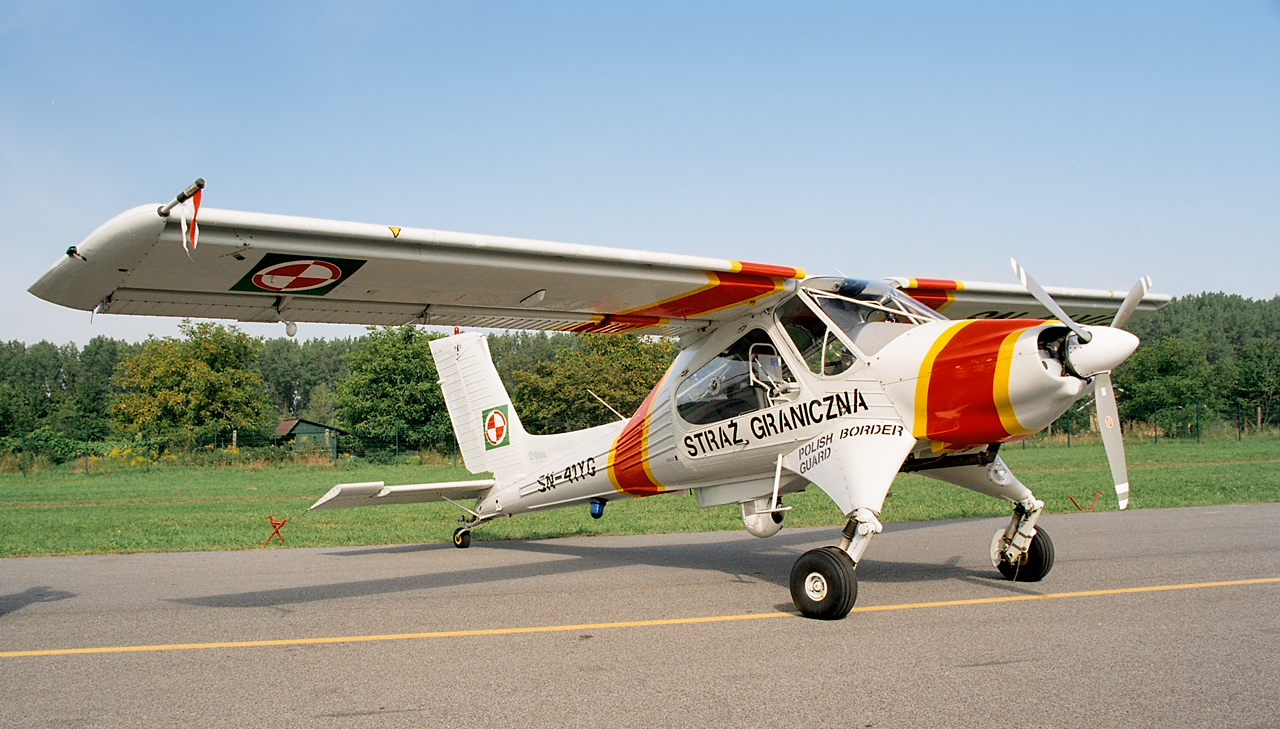
PZL-104M

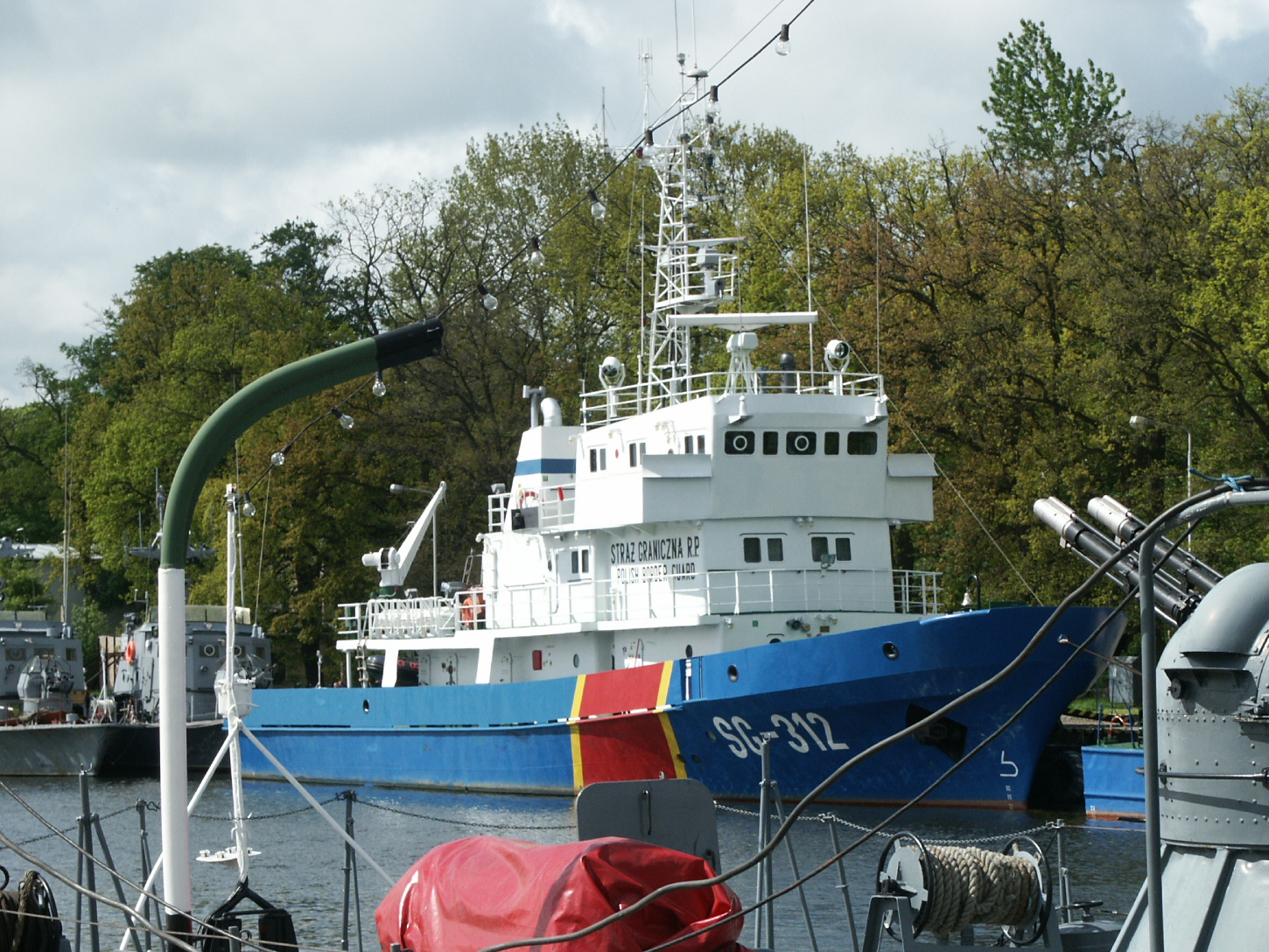
Kaper-2 Patrol Craft

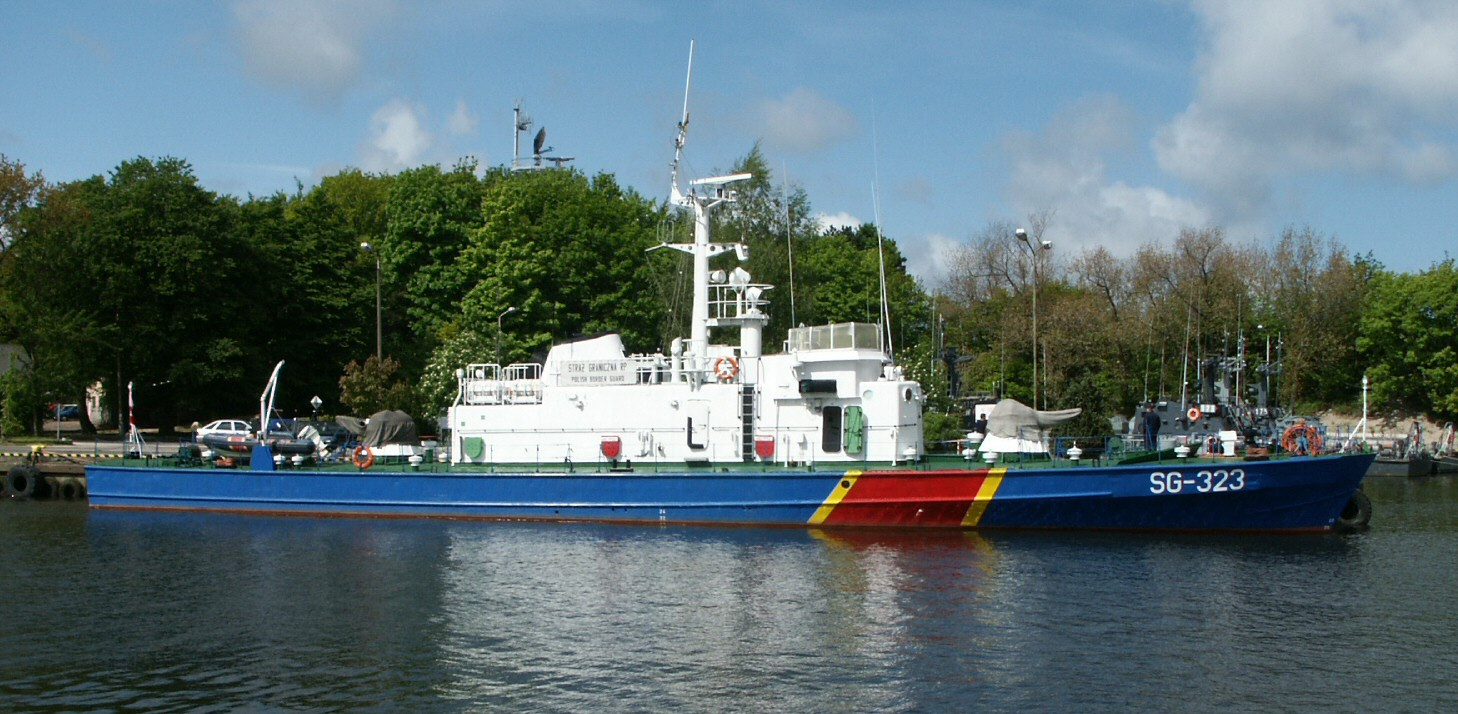
SG-323 Patrol Craft

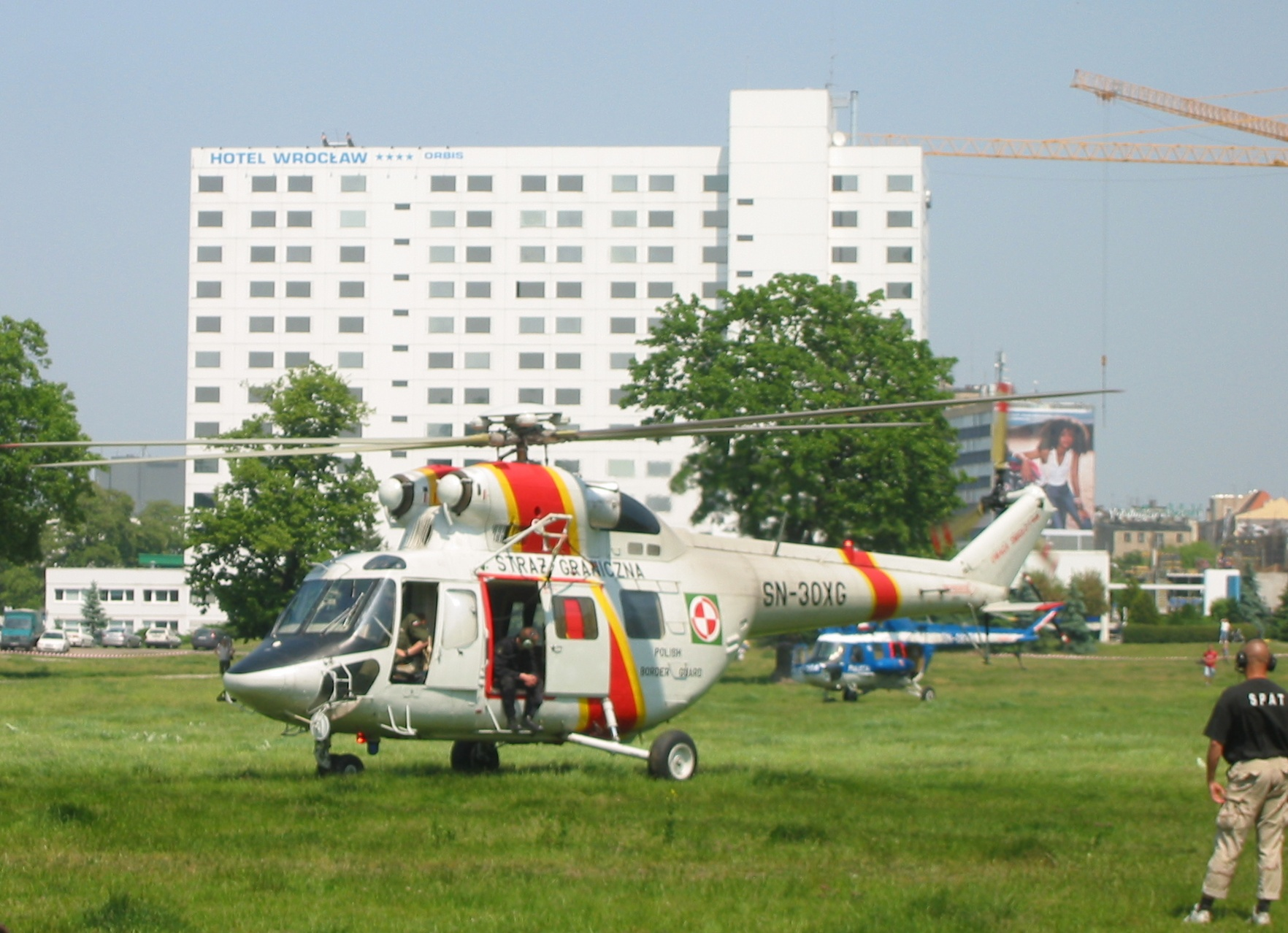
PZL W-3

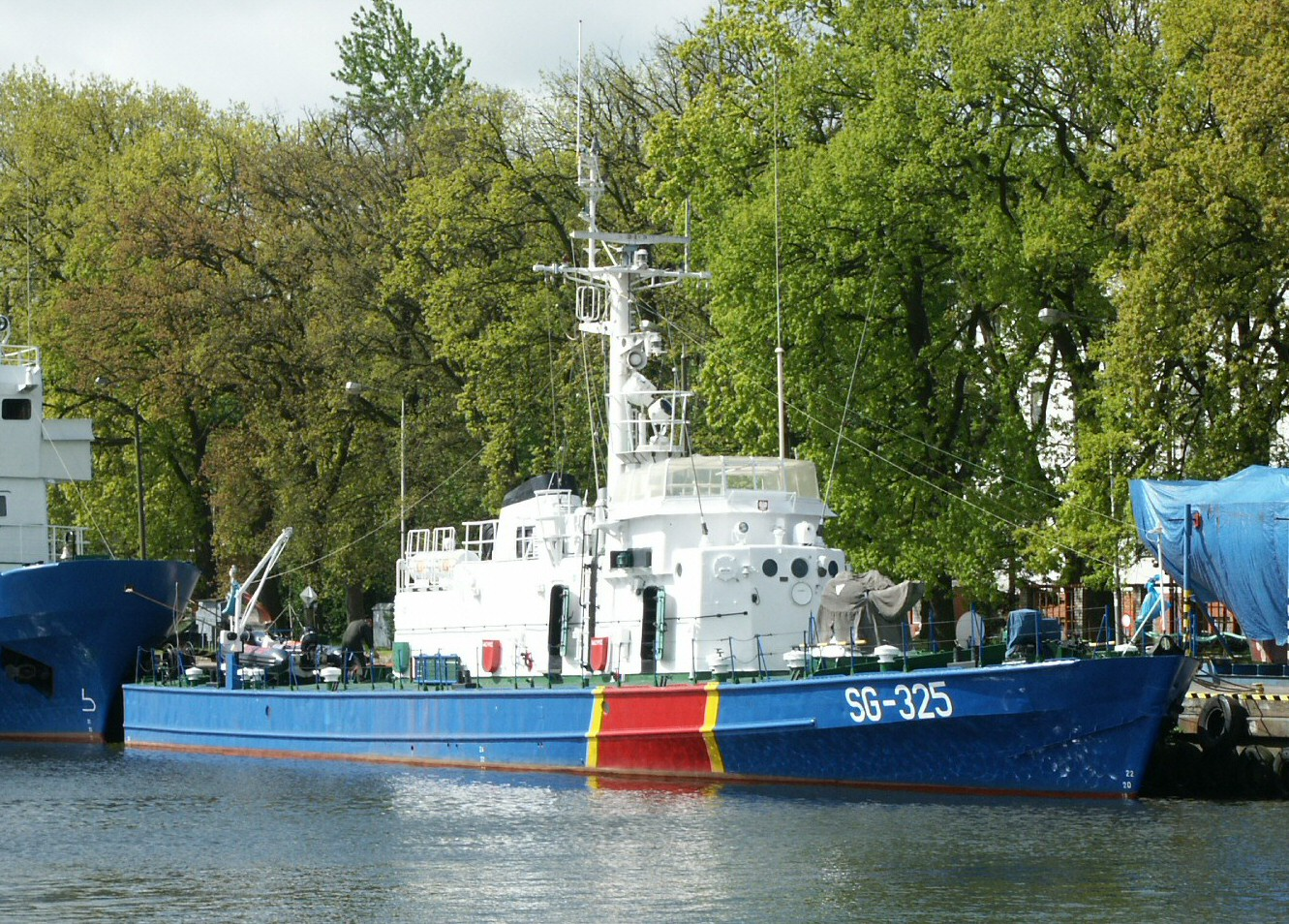
SG-325 Patrol Craft

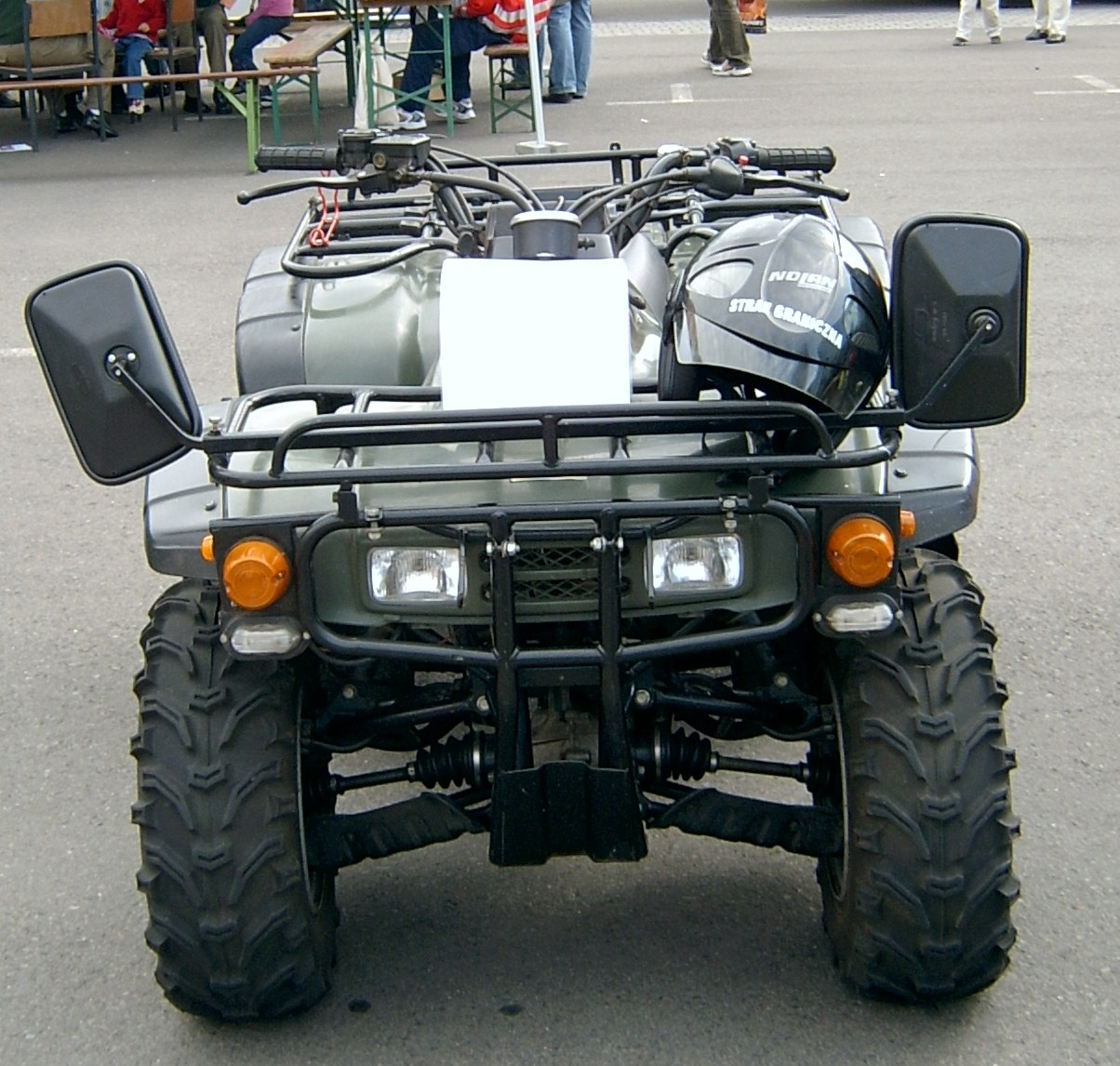
Quad vehicle of Border Guard

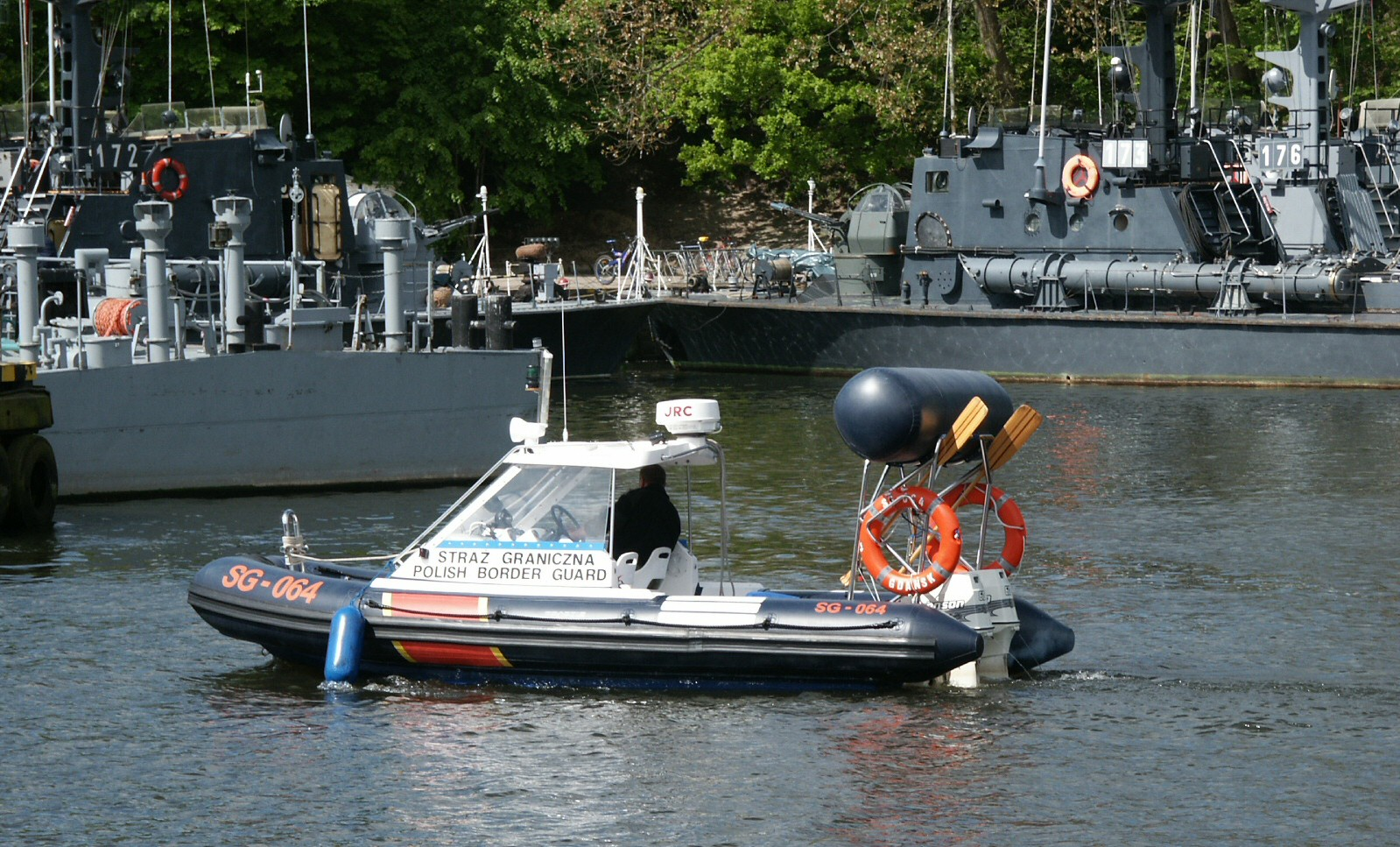
Motorboat of Border Guard

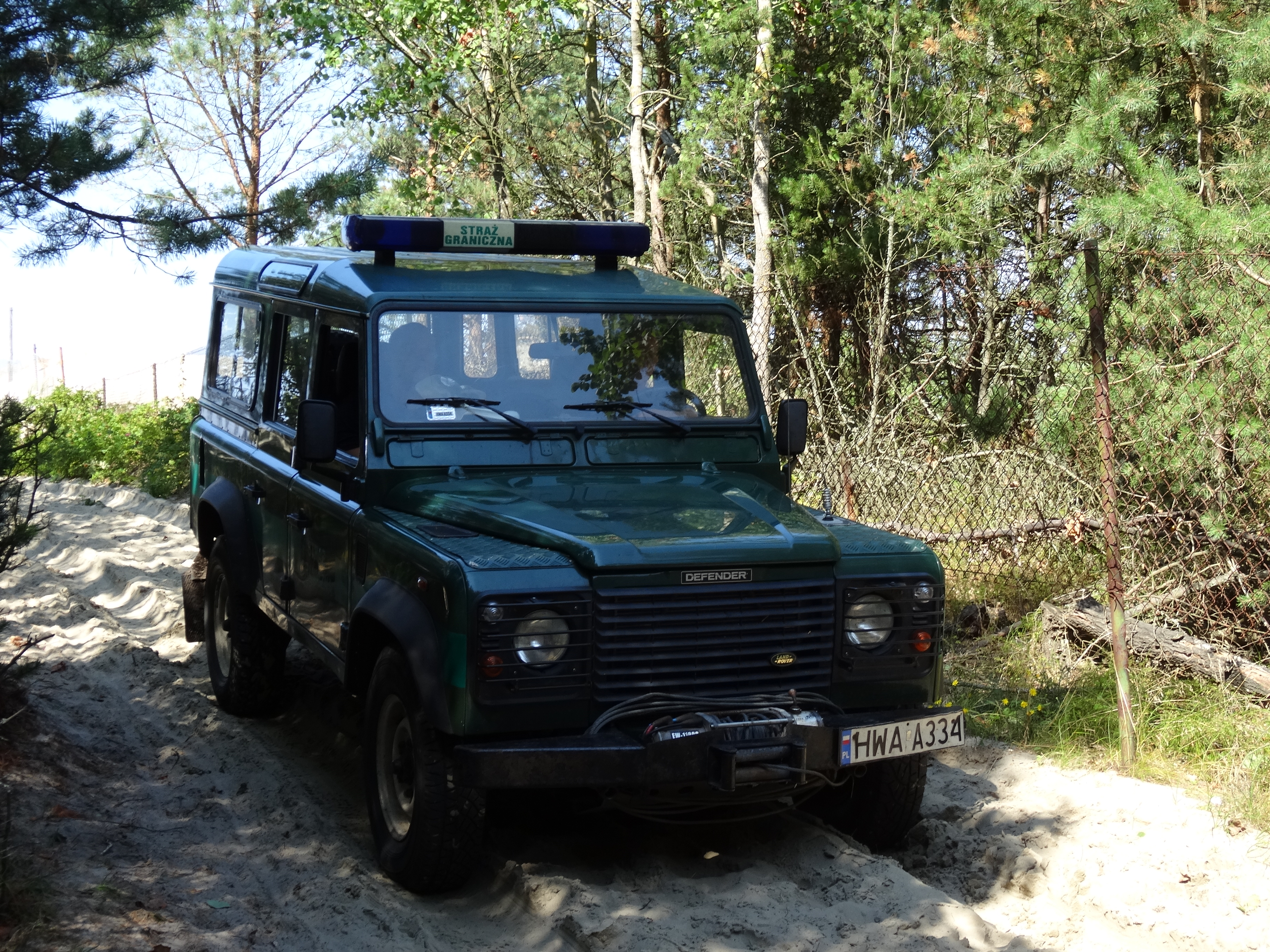
Land Rover Defender

== See also ==
- Border Protection Corps, the border guard in the Second Polish Republic
- Border Protection Forces, the border guard in the Polish People's Republic
- Tax and Customs Service (Poland)
