= City Guard (Poland) =

Municipal police forces of Poland

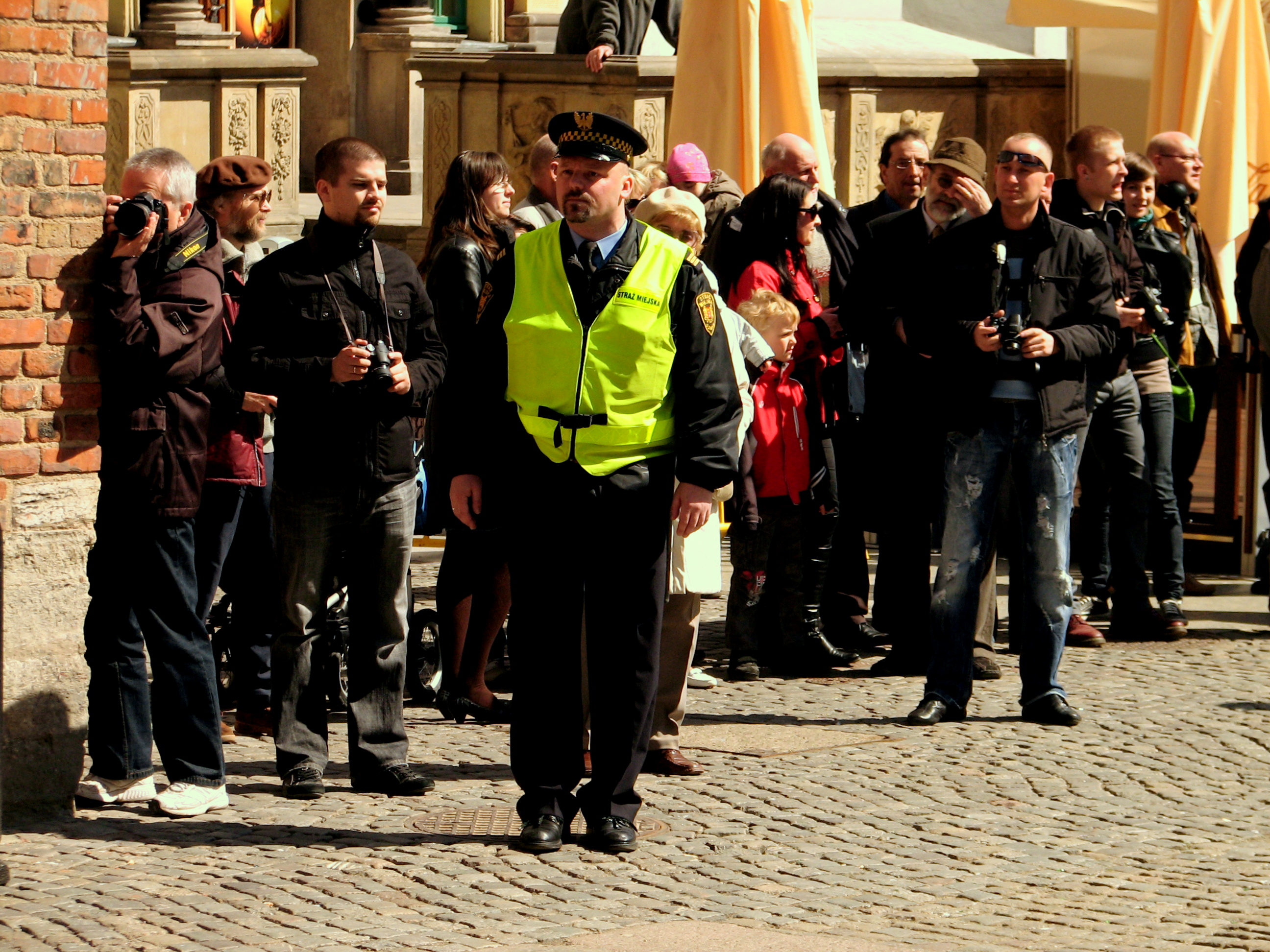
A City Guard maintaining order at a re-enactment event in Gdańsk

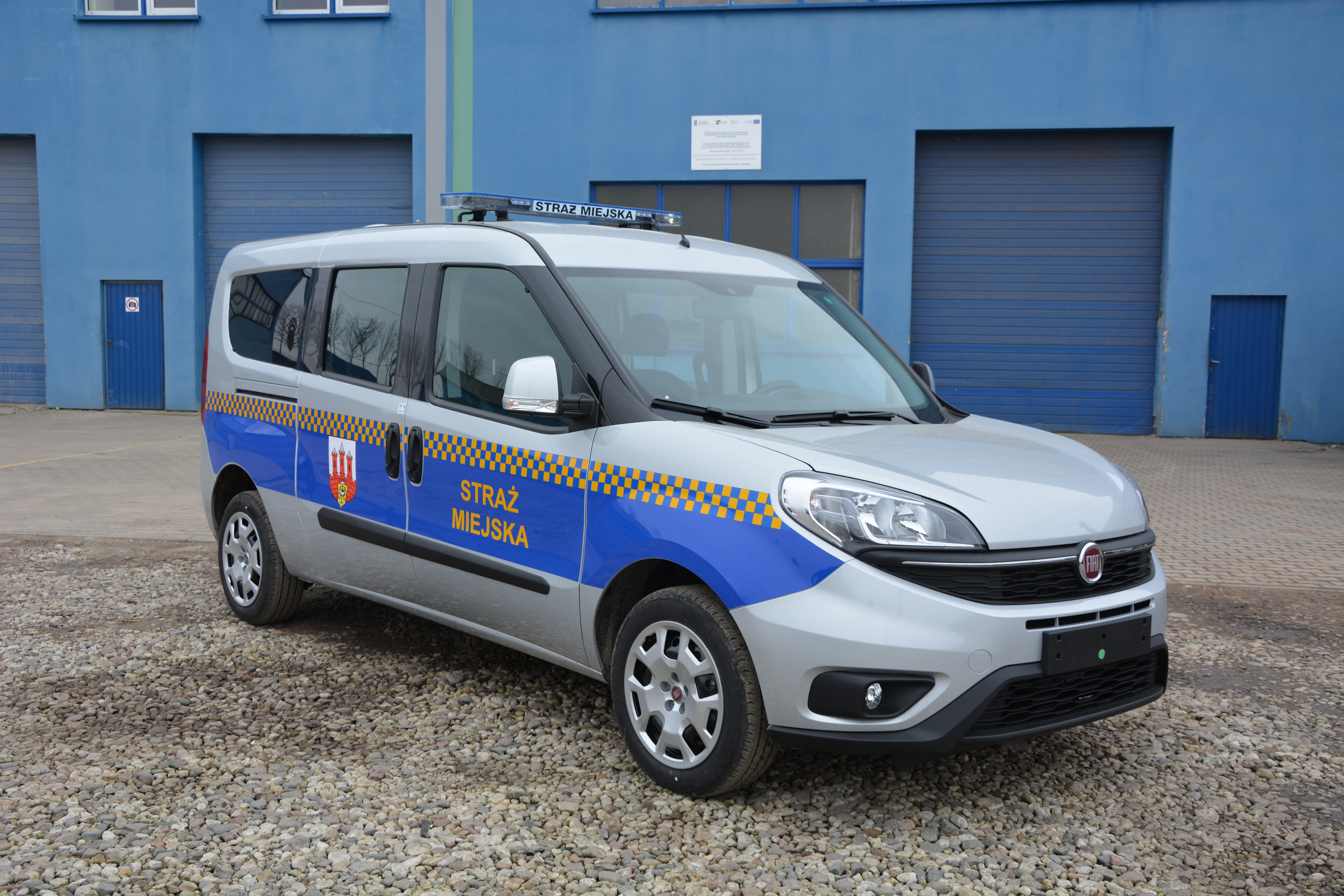
Bolesławiec City Guard patrol car

The City Guard (Polish: Straż miejska, pronounced [ˈstraʂ ˈmjɛjska]), also known as the Municipal Guard (Polish: Straż gminna), is the name given to the separate municipal police forces funded, directed and administered by some of the gmina (municipalities) of Poland. They operate in conjunction with the Policja, the Polish national police.

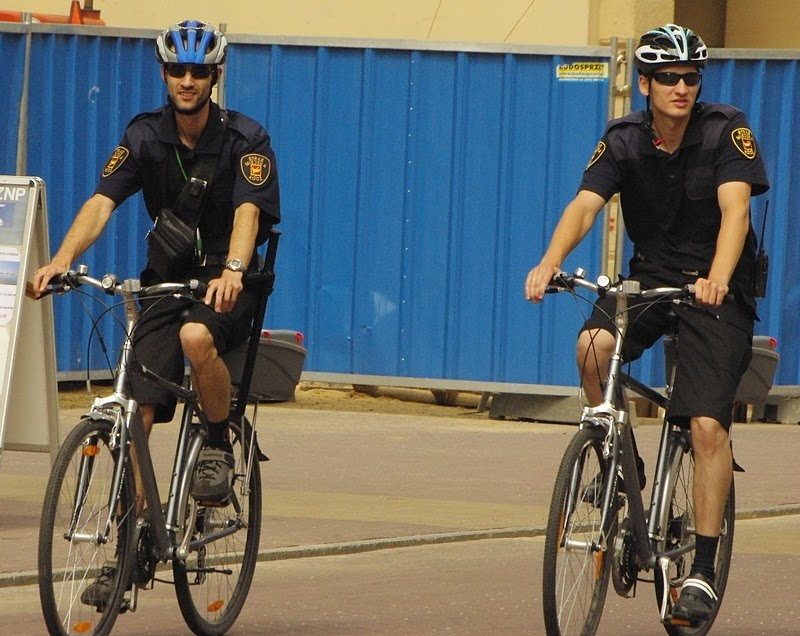
City guards in Łodz

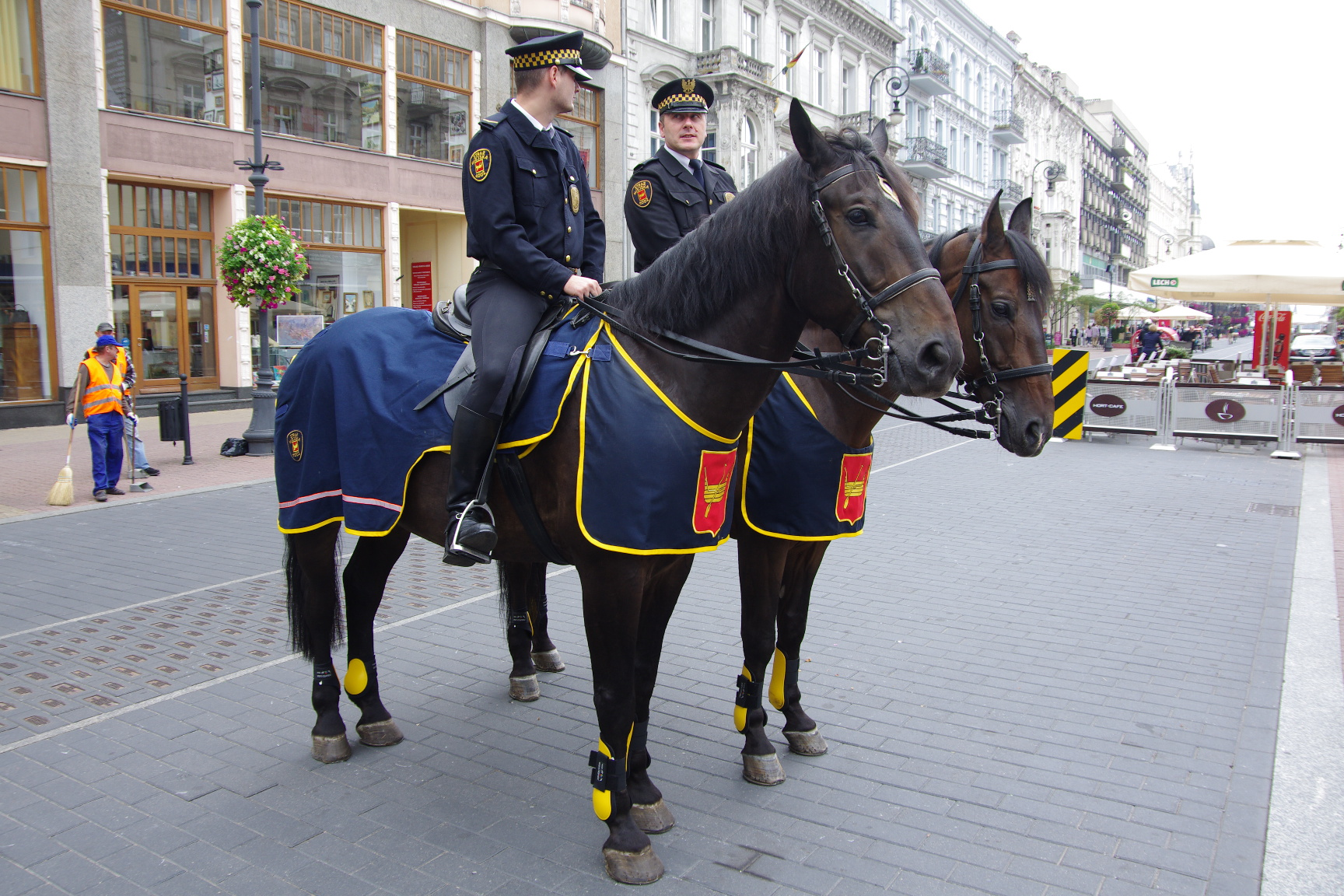
City guards in Łodz

The present arrangement for municipal police in Poland was created after the fall of Communism, partly to provide a 'counterweight' to a national police force, and partly to ensure that the needs of local communities were not neglected with such a centralized agency.

City Guards have fewer powers than the Policja (for instance they do not have a power of arrest), and can only exercise what powers they have in their own municipality. They have jurisdiction over misdemeanors, supervise and protect the safety of citizens and property, and assist the Policja in public order, road safety and so on. They cannot investigate criminal cases beyond the securing of a crime scene; in the event of a major incident a City Guard must request the aid of an officer of the Policja. Straż Miejska can also perform security guard duties and transport valuables for the municipality.

They are known to be equipped with batons, handcuffs, tear gas spray and, more recently, tasers. They can also be equipped with firearms when performing municipal property security guard or valuable transporting duties. They also have hats or caps with a characteristic yellow-black checkerboard pattern.

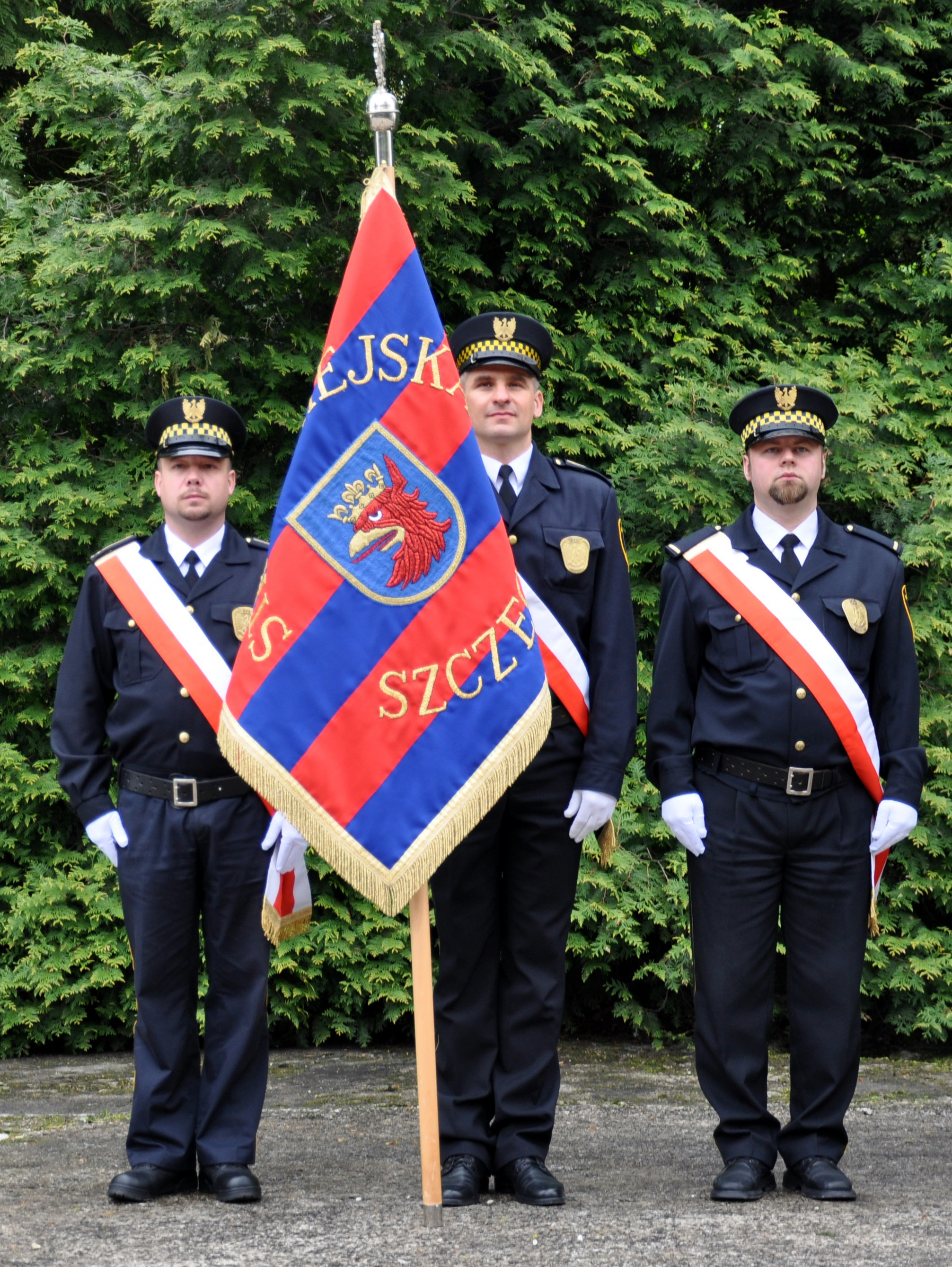
Department in Szczecin

The Straż Miejska are similar in function to municipal police agencies in, for example, Municipal Police in France and to Police Community Support Officers in police forces in England and Wales in the United Kingdom as well as Handhaving in The Netherlands. The regulations also standardize the appearance of municipal police cars. Guard vehicles are to be silver in color with a distinctive stripe in the form of a three-row yellow and dark blue checkerboard. The provision applies to police cars purchased after July 1, 2012.

== Rank structure ==
Polish municipal police (Straż Miejska) badge

Aplikant; Aspirant	Młodszy Strażnik; Junior Guard	Strażnik Guard	Starszy Strażnik; Senior Guard

Młodszy specjalista Junior specialist	Specjalista Specialist	Starszy specjalista Senior specialist

Młodszy inspektor Junior inspector	Inspektor Inspector	Starszy inspektor Senior inspector

Z-ca kierownika Deputy supervisor	Kierownik; Supervisor	Z-ca naczelnika Deputy director	Naczelnik; Director

Z-ca komendanta Straży; Vice chief	Komendant Straży; Chief

== See also ==
- Law enforcement in Poland
- Municipal Police
