= Prisons in Poland =

As of 2007, there were 85 prisons in Poland (zakłady karne). At the end of that year, Polish prisons had an official capacity of 79,213 inmates, but reported 87,776 persons in custody (110.8% of capacity). As of 2011, there were 215 correctional institutions, including 70 institutions for pre-trial detainees, 87 prisons, 14 hospitals, and 44 other units. By February 2019, inmate numbers had dropped to 74,352 (196 per 100,000 of the general population). Of this number, 10.7% were pre-trial detainees, 4.2% were female, 0.1% were minors, and 1.4% were foreign prisoners.

Prisons in Poland fall under the jurisdiction of the Ministry of Justice of the Republic of Poland, but are administered by Służba Więzienna (Polish: Prison Service). As of 2019, the head of the Prison Service was Director General Jacek Kitliński.

The largest prison in Poland is Wronki Prison.

== Prison regimes ==
When entering the Polish prison system, prisoners are sorted into one of three regimes: the program regime (which operates in 19 prisons), therapeutic regime, or regular regime. The program regime, which runs three months, guides prisoners in “structured activities”; the therapeutic regime, of similar length, helps prisoners with alcoholism, drug abuse, and mental illness through individual and group therapy.

== Problems in Polish prisons ==
Overcrowding has historically been an issue in Polish correctional facilities. Since 2014, prisons have run close to capacity, with average occupancy above 90%. Further, “(living) space per prisoner (has often been) less than the stated minimum in (Polish) legislation," meaning that Polish jailers have been forced to place 3-5 prisoners in cells made for two. Overcrowding has also led to health problems, especially regarding hygiene and mental health, as showers are used constantly without maintenance.

The largest substance abuse problem in Poland's jails is alcohol abuse. Drugs such as cannabis, cocaine, and heroin have also been reported. Injectable drugs are not considered as much of a problem, as hypodermic needle possession has not been reported. Certain prisons have specific units dedicated to individuals suffering from alcoholism or other drug addictions. Patients may be held in these units for a period of three to six months, during which they participate in therapeutic meetings. In an attempt to combat drug abuse in Polish prisons, the Prison Service has instituted methadone treatment in two institutions as a pilot project, with an aim to assisting Poland's 1,000 prison addicts.

Prison population trends
Year	Prison population	Rate (per 100,000)
2000	70,544	184
2002	80,467	211
2004	80,368	211
2006	88,647	232
2008	83,152	218
2010	80,728	212
2012	84,156	221
2014	77,371	204
2016	71,528	188
2018	72,204	190
2020	67,894	179
2022	71,228	190

== See also ==
- Law enforcement in Poland
- Mokotów Prison
