= Standard-bearer (Eastern Europe) =

Military rank in Poland and Ukraine

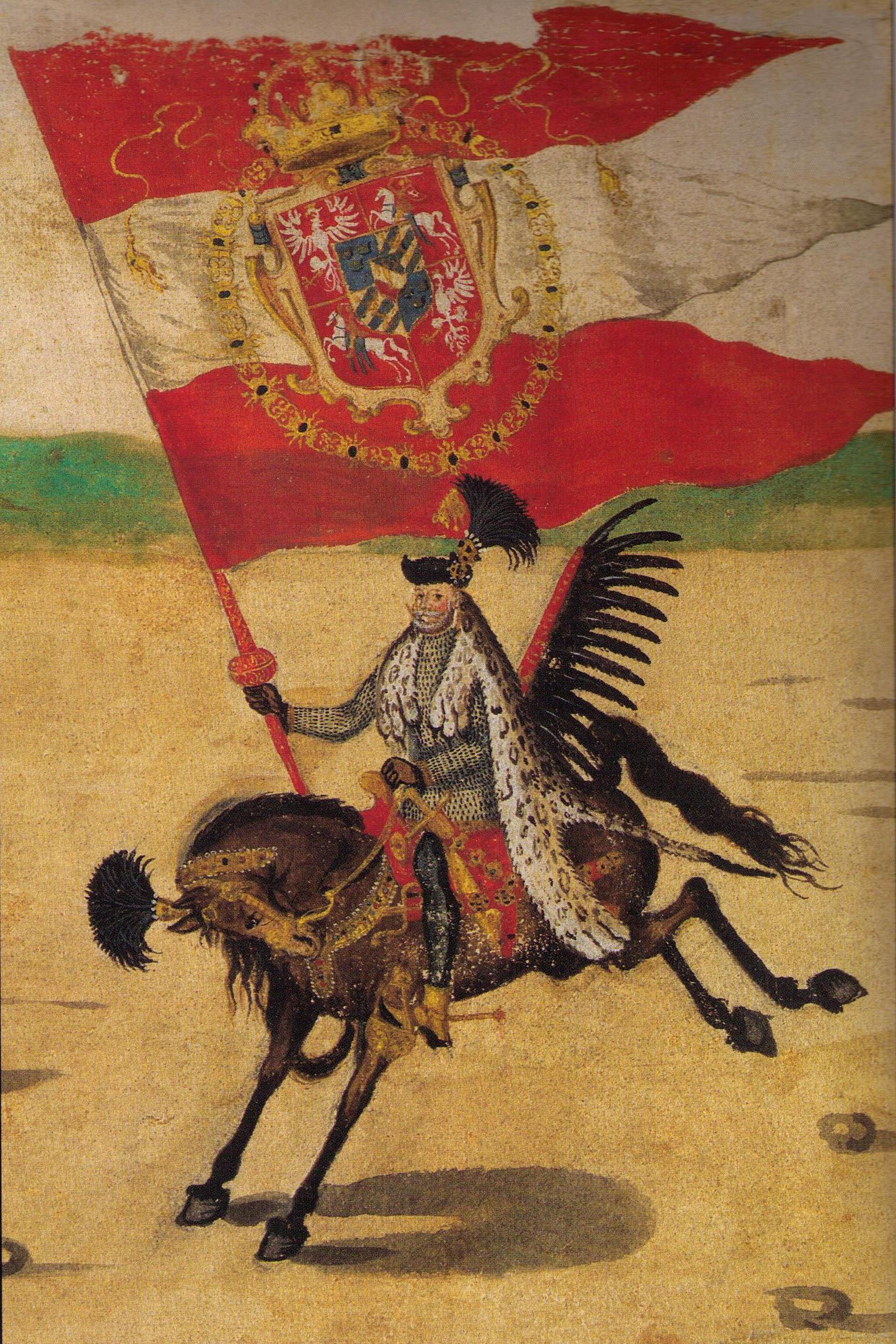
Great Chorąży of the Polish Crown, 1605

A standard-bearer (Polish: Chorąży [xɔˈrɔ̃ʐɨ]; Russian and Ukrainian: хорунжий, romanized: khorunzhyi; Lithuanian: vėliavininkas, chorunžis; Belarusian: харунжы, romanized: kharunzhy) is a military rank in Poland, Lithuania, Ukraine and some neighboring countries. A chorąży was once a knight who bore an ensign, the emblem of an armed troops, a voivodship, a land, a duchy, or a kingdom. This function later evolved into a non-hereditary noble title.

From the end of the 14th century in the Kingdom of Poland and the Grand Duchy of Lithuania, and later in the Polish–Lithuanian Commonwealth, there were four "central" chorąży positions:

- Grand Standard-Bearer of the Crown;
- Grand Standard-Bearer of Lithuania;
- Court Standard-Bearer of the Crown;
- Court Standard-Bearer of Lithuania.

At the same time, chorąży was also an honorary office in a land.

From the 16th century, Chorąży was the title of the military leader of a Cossack community, and later a rank in the Cossack Hosts. The rank, written "хорунжий" (khorunzhiy) in Russian, was officially recognized in the 1792 Table of Ranks. This Cossack junior officer rank corresponded to the rank of second lieutenant (подпоручик, or podporuchik) of infantry or cornet of cavalry.

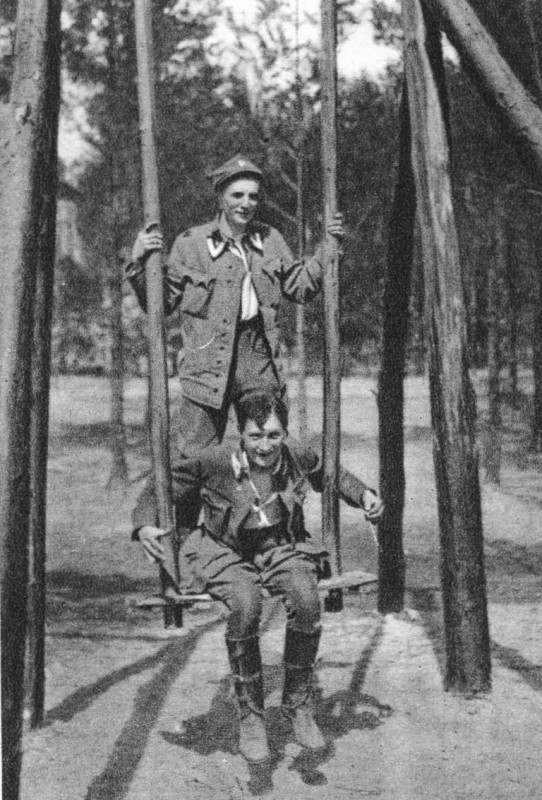
Two chorążys in the Polish Legions, pictured in 1916.

In the Polish Legions (1914–18), the Second Polish Republic in 1919–22 and from 1963 in the People's Republic of Poland (from 1989, in contemporary Poland), it has been a non-commissioned officer's rank, above sergeants' and below second lieutenant. Warrant Officer OR-7, OR-8, OR-9. Between 1944 and 1957, it was the lowest officer's rank.

== Poland ==
=== History ===
Corps warrant officers is the name of the personal body of soldiers in the Polish Army, which existed between 1963 and 2004, higher than the NCO corps, and lower than the officer. The body was introduced in 1963, expanded in terms of the hierarchy in 1967 and 1996 and again in July 2004 it was abolished as a separate rank, while the ranks of soldiers wearing standard-bearers included senior NCOs. At the time of the introduction of this corps, professional soldiers who are its members should hold a secondary education matriculation. Virtually warrant were highly skilled technicians.

The decision of the politicians who are motivated in their conduct by a lack of warrant officers in the armies of both NATO and others, the warrant officers corps was liquidated, dropping them to the NCO corps. Result was a marked change in the ratio between officers and NCOs standard-bearers. This decision is criticized, among others for the fact that according to some stakeholders the possibility of multiple standard-bearer was closed and education skills, because that decision is thought to be supportive of officers' responsibilities as including the planning and decision-making process(es), whereas that of non-commissioned officers include carrying out officers' orders.

=== Insignia ===
NATO Code	OR-9		OR-8	OR-6
Polish Land Forces
Polish Land Forces	Starszy chorąży sztabowy	Starszy chorąży	Chorąży	Młodszy chorąży
	Senior staff standard-bearer	Senior standard-bearer	Standard-bearer	Junior standard-bearer
Polish Air Force
Polish Air Force	Starszy chorąży sztabowy	Starszy chorąży	Chorąży	Młodszy chorąży
	Senior staff standard-bearer	Senior standard-bearer	Standard-bearer	Junior standard-bearer
Polish Navy
Polish Navy	Starszy chorąży sztabowy marynarki	Starszy chorąży marynarki	Chorąży marynarki	Młodszy chorąży marynarki
	Naval senior staff standard-bearer	Naval senior standard-bearer	Naval standard-bearer	Naval junior standard-bearer
NATO Code	OR-9		OR-8	OR-6

== See also ==
- Ensign (military rank)
- Hatamoto
- Khorugv
- Offices in the Polish–Lithuanian Commonwealth
- Podchorąży
- Vexillarius
