= Platoon-leader (Poland) =

Plutonowy (literally Platoon-man) is an NCO rank in the Polish Armed Forces rank insignia system, located between the ranks of Senior Corporal and Sergeant. As one of two OR-4 ranks in the Polish Army (the other being the rank of starszy kapral), the rank of plutonowy could be considered a Polish equivalent of Corporal, Unteroffizier or Master corporal in other NATO armies. The direct translation of Corporal to Polish, the rank of kapral is a lower grade in Polish Armed Forces, equivalent to OR-3 grades of other armies, such as Lance corporal or Private first class.

The rank was introduced in the Polish Army in 1919. Initially graded as one of "junior NCO" class, since 1967 it is considered one of "senior NCO" class. Currently a non-commissioned officer in the rank of plutonowy in most cases occupies the post of a troop commanding officers, or a chief of a single machine in technical services (radio station commander, electricity plant commander and so on).

The rank of plutonowy is paralleled in the Polish Navy by the rank of bosmanmat (literally boatswain-mate).

Until 1967 the rank insignia of a plutonowy were three bars. In that year, as part of a set of changes modifying the service in the Polish Army to better fit the Soviet scheme, a fourth bar was added.

NATO Code	OR-5	OR-4		OR-3
Land Forces
Polish:	Sierżant	Plutonowy	Starszy kapral	Kapral
Abbreviation	sierż.	plut.	st.kpr.	kpr.
English:	Sergeant	Platoon-leader	Senior Corporal	Corporal
