= Podchorąży =

Podchorąży is the Polish military title of officer cadets of various ranks. The term literally means "under-ensign" (or could be rendered as sub-flagbearer, second flagbearer, or deputy flagbearer) and historically has referred to an officer cadet who served as an aide to a senior officer.

In the modern Polish Armed Forces, podchorąży title is used in officer-training programs; it applies to a cadet who has not yet been commissioned an officer.

Poland has several officer-cadet programs, including the General Tadeusz Kościuszko Military University of Land Forces (in Wrocław), the Military University of Technology (in Warsaw), the Polish Naval Academy (in Gdynia) and the Polish Air Force Academy (in Dęblin).

The title of podchorąży applies to cadets who are still in training and have not yet been commissioned. At this time, they may hold the military ranks from private to sergeant.

Podchorąży should not be confused with "chorąży", which is senior NCO rank equivalent to NATO ranks OR-6 to OR-9.

== See also ==
- Comparative military ranks
