= Referendums by country =

A referendum (in some countries synonymous with plebiscite, or a vote on a ballot question) is a direct vote in which an entire electorate is asked to either accept or reject a particular proposal. This article summarises referendum laws and practice in various countries.

== Summary table ==
Turnout requirements for a referendum by country: Turnout threshold of 50% or more Turnout threshold between 26% and 39% Turnout threshold of 25% or less Historically no threshold, with few exceptions No turnout threshold required for the referendum to be binding No legal provision for national referendums Allows referendums, but data on a possible turnout threshold is not available No data

The table below refers to nationwide referendums.

Country	Referendum law	Binding referendum on demand	Turnout threshold to be binding	Referendum approval needed to amend constitution?	Last referendum	Ref.
Australia	Yes / No Referendum requirement created by the Constitution not by statute law	No	Double majority of 50% + 1 of all votes cast nationally, and by a majority of votes cast within a majority of the original states (4 of 6). If the amendment affects the parliamentary representation or the limits of one or more states, then a majority in those state(s) are also required.	Yes Referendums in Australia are exclusively used for the purpose of amending the Constitution	2023	
Austria	Yes	No	—N/a	Yes / No Comprehensive change	2013	
Belgium	No	No	-	No	1950	
Chile	Yes	No	None	No	2023	
Colombia	Yes	Yes; Signatures of 10% of registered voters needed	25%	No	2018	
Croatia	Yes	Yes; Signatures of 10% of registered voters needed	None	—N/a	2013	
Czech Republic	No on state level (except EU referendum), but on regional and municipal level allowed	No	None	No	2003	
Ecuador	Yes	Yes; Signatures of 10% of registered voters needed	50%	Yes	2018	
Estonia	Yes	No	None	Yes / No chapters "General Provisions" and "Amendment of the Constitution"	2003	
France	Yes	No	None	No	2005	
Hungary	Yes	Yes; Signatures of 200,000 voters needed	50%	No	2022	
Indonesia	No	No	-	No	-	
(Republic of Ireland) Ireland	Yes	No	None	Yes	March 2024	
Italy	Yes (only to abolish existing law or when it is requested to approve a constitutional change; see: referendums in Italy)	Yes; Signatures of 500,000 voters or 5 Regional Councils needed	50%	No (only for advisory referendums, like in 1989)	2025	
Kazakhstan	Yes	Yes; Signatures of 200,000 voters needed	50%	Yes / No The President can choose to bypass a public vote to adopt changes; however, if a referendum is held, it requires a national majority plus approval in two-thirds of all regions to pass.	2026	
Liechtenstein	Yes	Yes; Signatures of 1,500 voters needed	50%	Yes	2024	
Lithuania	Yes	No	At least 33% of registered voters in favour	Yes / No Amendments to chapters 1 and 14	2019	
Malaysia	No	No	-	No	-	
North Korea	No	No	-	No	-	
Norway	No	No	-	No	1994	
Philippines	Yes / No Law on initiatives on amending constitution ruled by the Supreme Court as "fatally defective", can still be used for other types of initiatives	Yes; Signatures of 10% of registered voters, with 3% in every legislative district needed	None	Yes	1987	
Poland	Yes	No	50%	No	2023	
Romania	Yes	No	30%	Yes	2019	
Slovakia	Yes	Yes; Signatures of 350,000 voters needed	50%	No	2023	
Slovenia	Yes	Yes; Signatures of 40,000 voters needed	50%	No	2025	
Sweden	Yes	No	—N/a	No	2003	
Switzerland	Yes	Yes; Signatures of 50,000 voters needed	None	Yes	ongoing	
Saudi Arabia	No	No	-	No	-	
South Korea	Yes	No	50%	Yes	1987	
Taiwan	Yes	Yes; Signatures of 1.5% of registered voters needed	At least 25% of registered voters in favour	Yes Constitutional amendments regulated by Additional Articles of the Constitution, not by statute law	2025	
Turkey	Yes	No	None	No	2017	
United Kingdom	Yes - Each referendum requires a separate Act of Parliament	No	No standing requirement; the determination of a threshold is a political decision for each referendum. The UK has no history of applying special thresholds, with very few exceptions.	No	2016	
United States	No	No	-	No	-	

== Africa ==
=== Egypt ===
On 19 March 2011 a constitutional referendum was held in Egypt, following the Egyptian Revolution of 2011. The reforms made it easier for candidates to run for president, limited the number of presidential terms to two four-year periods, and ensured judicial monitoring of elections.

=== Eritrea ===
In April 1993 nearly 1 million voters in Eritrea (a quarter of the population), cast ballots to become "sovereign and independent" of Ethiopia. This vote was the result of thirty years of war by Eritreans during their War of Independence. The result was a vote for independence by 99.8% of the voters.

=== Kenya ===
Kenya has had three referendums.

=== Sudan ===
In 2011, Sudan conducted a referendum in Southern Sudan to choose between continued unity and separation from Sudan. The result was overwhelmingly in favour of separation, with 98.83% of voters supporting the move. Consequently, the region became independent on 9 July 2011, forming the Republic of South Sudan.

=== Morocco ===
There have been several referendums in Morocco, most of which were related to the Moroccan constitution. Since becoming King, Mohammed VI has led many reforms that made Morocco an exception from all the other Arab countries. On February 20, 2011, thousands took to the streets of Rabat, Casablanca, Tangier and Marrakesh in peaceful protests demanding a new constitution, a change in government and an end to corruption. During a march on Hassan II Avenue in Rabat, demonstrators demanded a new constitution to bring more democracy to the country. They shouted slogans calling for economic opportunity, education reform, better health services, and help in coping with the rising cost of living.

On March 9, King Mohammed VI made a speech that was described as a "historical" speech in which he announced several reforms including a new constitution to the country.

In a televised speech on Friday, 17 June, King Mohammed VI announced a series of constitutional reforms, to be put to a national referendum on 1 July. The proposed reforms would give the prime minister and the parliament more executive authority, and would make Berber an official language in Morocco, together with Arabic. The proposal would empower the prime minister with the authority to appoint government officials and to dissolve the parliament - the powers previously held by the king. However, the king would remain the military commander-in-chief and would retain his position as the chair of the Council of Ministers and the Supreme Security Council, the primary bodies responsible for the security policy. A new constitutional provision would also confirm the king's role as the highest religious authority in the country.

Although most people were celebrating among the protesters after the King's speech, the leaders of the 20 February Movement rejected the proposals as insufficient and called for continuing protests on 19 June 2011. On 29 June 2011, the protesters called for a boycott of the referendum. The referendum was held on July 1, and almost all Moroccans said yes to it with a "98% yes" "2% No" turnout.

== Asia ==
=== Bangladesh ===
Year	Type	Date	Question	Significance	Result
1977	Motion of confidence	30 May 1977	Do you have confidence in President Major General Ziaur Rahman and the policies and programs adopted by him?	The referendum on was held to seek public approval for the confidence of policies and programs under Ziaur Rahman.	Successful - 98.9% of votes saying yes, with a voter turnout of 88.1%.
1985	Motion of confidence	21 March 1985	Do you support the policies of President Ershad, and do you want him to continue to run this administration until a civilian government is formed through elections?	The referendum was held to seek public approval for the continuation of military rule under Hussain Muhammad Ershad.	Successful - 94% vote in favour with a turnout of 72%.
1991	Constitutional	15 September 1991	"Should or not the President assent to the Constitution (Twelfth Amendment) Bill, 1991 of the People's Republic of Bangladesh?"	The amendments would lead to the reintroduction of parliamentary government, with the President becoming the constitutional head of state, but the Prime Minister the executive head. It also abolished the position of vice-president and would see the President elected by Parliament.	Successful - 83.6% vote in favour, with a turnout of 35.2%.
2026	Constitutional	12 February 2026	"Do you approve of the July National Charter (Constitution Amendment) Implementation Order, 2025, and the following proposals for constitutional reform as recorded in the July National Charter?"	The referendum propounds reforms to countervail among state institutions — the legislature, executive and judiciary and improve accountability in governance. If the referendum is passed, the newly elected parliament will act as a constituent assembly to enact the changes in the constitution agreed in the charter.	Successful - 68.26% vote in favour, with a turnout of 60%.

=== East Timor ===
East Timor, formerly governed by Indonesia, held a referendum on 30 August 1999, in which voters chose either to become a Special Autonomous Region within Indonesia, or for independence. 78.5% of voters opted for independence.

=== Hong Kong ===
Due to discontent towards the proposal of political reform made by the Hong Kong government, the Civic Party and the League of Social Democrats joined to carry out "Five Constituencies Referendum" in early 2010, by having one Legislative Councillor (from either one of the parties) in each constituency resigned, forcing the government to carry out a by-election, thus giving a chance for all voters to show their will towards universal suffrage and the abolition of functional constituencies. This is often called a "de facto referendum".

The Basic Law of Hong Kong does not provide for official referendums, but the pan-democrats hope that by returning the resignees to the Legislative Council, on their manifesto of real political reform in Hong Kong and the abolition of functional constituencies, the election can be seen as a de facto referendum and an endorsement of these issues.

The original five pan-democrat Legislative Councillors were re-elected, the turnout was much lower than the expectation of the two parties, due to the suppression of pro-Beijing Camp.

=== India ===
The Constitution of India does not have a specific provision for or against referendum. Some of the referendums held in India are:

- 1947 Sylhet referendum was held in Sylhet district on 6 July 1947 to decide whether the district would remain in Assam and join the newly formed country India or would join East Bengal (present day Bangladesh), a part of the newly formed country Pakistan. The referendum was in favor of joining East Bengal.
- 1947 North-West Frontier Province referendum was held in the North-West Frontier Province of British India in July 1947 to decide whether the province would join the Dominion of India or Pakistan. The referendum was in favor of joining Pakistan.
- 1967 Goa status referendum was held in the state of Goa, India, on 16 January 1967, to decide the future of the Union Territory of Goa.
- 1975 Sikkimese monarchy referendum on abolishing the monarchy was held in Sikkim on 14 April 1975. It was approved by 97.55% of voters, and resulted in Sikkim becoming an Indian state.

=== Indonesia ===
Constitution of Indonesia does not mention referendums at all, and as such, referendums are not a part of Indonesian political practice. In 1985, the People's Consultative Assembly issued Act No. 5 of 1985 that officially recognized constitutional referendum as a legitimate political process in Indonesia, but revoked in 1999 by Act No. 6 of 1999. According to explanation given in Act No. 6 of 1999, referendum is not compatible with Indonesian doctrine of representative democracy, as on the fourth principles of the national ideology Pancasila, absence on mentions of referendums inside the national constitution also became another reason why the referendum law was revoked.

Indonesia had no nationwide referendum, but only regional one and concerning only on territorial changes. In 1969, Act of Free Choice (PEPERA) integrated Papua into Indonesia; despite the name reflecting a referendum, the process actually only involving around 1,000 representatives in a process of deliberation. An independence referendum in East Timor province took place in 1999, paving the way of East Timor province independence from Indonesia in 2002.

=== Iran ===
In 1979 and after the Islamic Revolution had toppled the Iranian monarchy, a referendum was held to choose the future governing system of the country. The question was a simple yes or no to the Islamic Republic, a system which combines direct representation with religious authority. The Islamic Republic was established after more than 98% of the population voted "Yes". The 1989 Iranian constitutional referendum was also held later, in which 97.57% voted 'yes'.

=== Iraq ===
The current Constitution of Iraq was approved by referendum on 15 October 2005, two years after the United States-led invasion. The constitution was designed to shift crucial decisions about government, the judiciary and human rights to a future national assembly. It was later modified to provide for the establishment of a committee by the parliament to be elected in December 2005 to consider changes to the constitution in 2006.

=== Kazakhstan ===
The Constitutional Law "On Republican Referendum" establishes the legal framework for holding nationwide referendums and was amended by Constitutional Law No. 305-VIII to reflect the institutional changes introduced by the 2026 Constitution. Under the updated law, referendums may be initiated by the president, the government, the Kurultai, the People's Council (Halyk Kenesi), or through a public initiative supported by at least 200,000 verified signatures, with representation from all regions and cities of republican significance. The president retains the authority to call a referendum by decree, which must specify the date of voting and the wording of the question submitted to voters. Public proposals to amend the constitution may be rejected by the president, although such a decision can be overridden by a four-fifths majority of the Kurultai.

A referendum is considered valid only if more than half of eligible voters participate. Constitutional amendments or a new constitution must receive majority support nationwide and approval in at least two-thirds of the regions, the capital, and cities of republican significance. The law prohibits referendums on issues concerning state independence, territorial integrity, the form of government, and the constitutional seven-year single presidential term. The updated legislation also introduced restrictions on foreign funding of referendum campaigns and established the supremacy of national law over international agreements.

=== Malaysia ===
The Malaysian Constitution does not mention referendums at all. There have been no referendums in Malaysian history.

=== Pakistan ===
General Pervez Musharraf held a referendum in Pakistan on 30 April 2002 to legitimize his presidency and assure its continuance after the approaching restoration of democracy. He thus extended his term to five years after the October 2002 elections. The voter turnout was 80 percent by most estimates, amidst claims of irregularities. A few weeks later, Musharraf went on TV and apologized to the nation for "irregularities" in the referendum.

=== Philippines ===
The Constitution of the Philippines can only be amended or revised via a national plebiscite. Major alteration of boundaries of autonomous regions, provinces, towns, cities and barangays (villages), including creation, merger and upgrading of new local government units from existing ones, are to be decided on local plebiscites amongst the affected places. A referendum is the final step in the approval of a people's initiative. All referendums are binding.

The present constitution was approved via a plebiscite in 1987. The last provincial-level plebiscite was for the secession of San Jose del Monte from Bulacan in 2023, which was rejected.

=== Singapore ===
According to the Constitution of Singapore, a referendum can be held in a few circumstances, including situations when a constitutional amendment passed by the Parliament is rejected by the president, or when the nation's sovereignty needs to be decided (i.e., merger or incorporation into other countries). There has been only one referendum in Singapore to date, the 1962 national referendum which decided the terms of a merger of Singapore into Malaysia. There were three choices: 1) To merge with Malaya, having autonomy in labour and education; 2) To merge with Malaya, having same status as the other states in Malaya; 3) To merge with Malaya, having terms similar to those of the Borneo territories. Option #1 won with 71% of the vote. Two years after the merger, Singapore's expulsion from Malaysia occurred on 9 August 1965 due to disagreements between the two political ideas.

=== Taiwan ===
The Referendum Act was promoted and introduced by the Democratic Progressive Party for years and then enacted by the Legislative Yuan in 2003. There had been six national referendums and two local referendums in Taiwan before several sections of the Referendum Act were revised to lower the threshold in December 2017. No national referendum had been approved until then. Following amendments to the law, ten more questions were asked at the national level during 2018.

=== Thailand ===
On 4 September 2008, amidst hundreds of thousands of protesters demanding the government resign, Thailand's premier Samak Sundaravej's government approved the idea of a referendum to ask the Thai electorate if it wanted to keep the government or not.

=== Turkey ===
Seven nationwide referendums have been held in Turkey since its foundation in 1923. Amendments to the constitution can be put to referendum by both the legislative branch (parliament) and the executive branch (president). The Constitution of Turkey provides for binding constitutional referendums.

== Europe ==
=== Austria ===
The Austrian constitution defines two types of referendums on the federal level: binding referendum and non-binding referendum. Binding referendum is mandatory if the president should be removed from office before the end of his term, and in case of comprehensive change of the Federal Constitution. Binding referendum is facultative (not mandatory) in case of non-comprehensive changes in the Federal Constitution. There was only one binding referendum in post-1945 Austria: European Union membership referendum.

The National Council has the power to call on a non-binding referendum on matters of great importance. There were two such referendums in post-1945 Austria: nuclear power referendum in 1978, and conscription referendum in 2013.

=== Belgium ===
Binding referendums in Belgium are not legally possible because of the constitutional principle that the country's powers are exercised by the nation and not by the people. Consequently, Belgium is a representative democracy, almost without any form of direct democracy.

Non-binding referendums on the municipal and provincial level are allowed. Non-binding referendums on the regional level are also allowed by law but the implementation decisions are lacking. This way government makes it impossible to make use of it.

=== Bulgaria ===
Five nationwide referendums have been held in Bulgaria since it gained its De Facto independence in 1878:

- On 19 November 1922 the question was if criminals from the three previous wars were to be prosecuted;
- On 8 September 1946 the question was if Bulgaria was to remain a monarchy or to become a republic;
- On 16 May 1971 the nation's approval of a new constitution was asked;
- On 27 January 2013 the question was if Bulgaria should develop its nuclear power by building a new nuclear power plant.
- On 6 November 2016 a three question referendum was held alongside the presidential elections.

Several regional referendums have been held as well.

=== Croatia ===
Referendums in Croatia can be called by:

- The Croatian Parliament
- The president of Croatia
- The population

The institution of a referendum is regulated by article 87. of the constitution of Croatia. Referendums can be called on any issue falling within the competence of the Croatian Parliament or on any other issue which the president of Croatia considers to be important for the independence, unity and existence of the Republic.

Since amendments to the constitution in 2001, the Parliament is obligated by constitution to call a referendum if signatures of 10% of registered voters in the Republic of Croatia are collected. The time frame for collecting the signatures is defined by the law on referendums, and it is 15 days.

=== Cyprus ===
Constitution of Cyprus has no mention of referendum (as of 2013). The only referendum to take place in independent Cyprus was a referendum on the Annan Plan.

=== Czech Republic ===
There are no provisions concerning referendums in the Constitution of the Czech Republic, except for "referendum concerning the accession of the Czech Republic to the European Union". Therefore, the only referendum ever held in the Czech Republic at the national level was Czech European Union membership referendum in 2003.

It is possible to hold a referendum at regional and municipal levels.

=== Denmark ===
In Denmark, after a law has been passed by parliament, one third of the members can demand a referendum. This does not apply to money bills or expropriation. A law that transfers sovereignty to an international organisation must be subjected to a referendum unless five-sixths of the MPs vote for it. In both cases, to defeat the law the no votes must not only outnumber the yes votes, they must also number at least 30% of the electorate. Since all referendums have had much more than 60% turnout, no bill has yet passed due to lack of interest.

In practice, referendums have been held every time new treaties of the European Union have been approved, even when more than five-sixths can be found. Recently, the Danish government was highly criticized when it did not hold a referendum regarding the controversial Lisbon treaty.

The Constitution of Denmark can be changed only after a referendum. To pass, the yes votes must not only outnumber the no votes, they must also number at least 40% of the electorate.

The present location of the border with Germany was determined by a referendum in 1920 after the German capitulation. See Schleswig.

=== Estonia ===
The Constitution of Estonia gives the Parliament of Estonia the power to submit a bill or other national issue to a binding referendum. If a bill which is submitted to a referendum does not receive a majority of votes in favour, the president of the Republic shall declare extraordinary elections to the Parliament.

There are some issues which cannot be submitted to the referendum: issues regarding the budget, taxation, financial obligations of the state, ratification and denunciation of international treaties, the declaration or termination of a state of emergency, or national defence.

Some parts of the Constitution can be amended only by a referendum, while the rest of Constitution can be amended either by a referendum or by other means.

A referendum was called by the Parliament of Estonia on two occasions since its independence from USSR was restored:

- a referendum on a new constitution and citizenship in 1992
- Estonian European Union membership referendum in 2003

Also, there was a referendum on Estonian independence in 1991 while Estonian SSR was still a part of the USSR.

=== Finland ===
The Constitution of Finland allows only for a non-binding referendum called on by the Parliament. If 50,000 Finnish citizens sign an initiative (for an act or a referendum), the Parliament has to discuss it, but the initiative is not binding.

As of 2013 there have been only two referendums in Finland:

- Finnish prohibition referendum in 1931
- Finnish European Union membership referendum in 1994.

=== France ===
Both Napoleon I (in power (1799–1815) and Napoleon III (in power 1848–1870) used plebiscites (rigged or otherwise: 1800, 1802, 1804, 1815, 1851, 1852, 1870) to support their political ascendancy.

The practice of referendums for tough decisions appeared with Charles De Gaulle's Fifth Republic, in order to overcome the Parliament. A referendum can be called by the president for constitutional changes, treaty ratification, laws concerning the administration or the territory. The political risks involved made the practice rare. Most constitutional revisions went through the super-majority of Parliament. Therefore, a procedure of popular initiative, backed by a handful of MPs, is being put in place.

=== Germany ===
Following World War II, West Germany was founded originally with only minor elements of direct democracy. At the federal level, there are only two mandatory constitutional referendum types. One type is for enacting a new constitution. Changes to the constitution do not require a public vote and there is no provision for an initiative for a constitutional amendment. There has never been a referendum of this type, although there was an argument in that direction during German reunification. The other type requires a regional public vote in case of restructuring the Bundesländer i.e. States (Neugliederung des Bundesgebietes, "New Arrangement of the Federal Territory") which led to a number of effectless referendums to create or recreate states or change the territory of a state. In addition there was a referendum on the merger of Baden and Württemberg into Baden-Württemberg in 1951 (accepted) and a referendum on the merger of Berlin and Brandenburg into Berlin-Brandenburg in 1996 (rejected).

Originally, only some of the Bundesländer (federated states) had provisions for a general binding referendum (Volksentscheid, "people's decision") on popular initiatives (Volksbegehren, "people's request"), with Hesse and Bavaria also having a mandatory binding referendum on changes to the state constitution. Over the years all states have changed their constitutions to allow various types of statewide and local referendums. In all states, there is now a general right for referendums on statewide popular initiatives, which was used in Hamburg to push the state government to pass a law on a facultative binding state referendum in 2007. Most states have a form of non-binding ballot question (Volksbefragung, "people's inquiry") which has rarely been used - the most important of these had been the 1955 Saar Statute referendum. General forms of direct democracy were introduced in the communities with facultative ballot questions (Bürgerbefragung, "citizens' inquiry") and public initiatives (Bürgerbegehren, "citizens' request") which are both non-binding. In some areas, this has been expanded into a binding referendum type (Bürgerentscheid, "citizens' decision").

=== Greece ===
The Constitution provides for two kinds of referendums:

- a referendum concerning a "passed law"
- a referendum concerning a matter of "national interest".

There were 8 referendums in Greece from 1920 to now. All but two have had to do with the form of government, namely retention/reestablishment or abolition of the monarchy. The two referendums not concerning the form of government was constitutional referendum in 1968 held by the military junta, and the 2015 Greek bailout referendum.

=== Hungary ===
The Constitution prescribes two ways to hold a referendum:

- upon the motion of at least two hundred thousand electors
- upon the motion of the president of the Republic, the Government or one hundred thousand electors.

The Constitution imposes a number of prohibitions on matters on which a referendum can be held, including amending Constitution, budget, taxing, obligations from international agreements, military operations, etc. Required voter turnout for the referendum to be valid is 50%. The decision made by a referendum is binding on the Parliament. There was one referendum in People's Republic of Hungary and there were 5 referendums in modern (post-1989) Hungary.

1. Migrant quota referendum (2016)

=== Iceland ===
The constitution of Iceland provides two articles on referendums:

- According to the 11th article, if 3/4 of the parliament votes to dismiss the president then that decision must be put to a binding referendum. If the people do not vote to dismiss the president, parliament is dissolved and new general elections are held.
- According to the 26th article, should the president veto a bill from the parliament then it must be put to a binding referendum.

A total of 8 referendums have been held in Iceland, three of which were held after the nation declared independence and became a republic in 1944.

1. Alcohol Prohibition referendum (1908)
2. Community service referendum (1916)
3. Sovereignty referendum (1918)
4. Prohibition referendum (1933)
5. Constitutional referendum (1944)
6. Loan guarantees referendum (2010)
7. Loan guarantees referendum (2011)
8. Icelandic constitution non-binding referendum (2011)
9. European Union membership negotiations referendum (2026)

=== Ireland ===
Constitutional referendums

The current Constitution of Ireland was adopted by plebiscite on 1 July 1937. In Ireland every constitutional amendment must be approved by referendum; 38 such referendums have occurred from the enactment of the current constitution to May 2019. Constitutional amendments are first adopted by both Houses of the Oireachtas (parliament), submitted to a referendum, and are signed into law by the president. The signature is merely a formality: the president cannot refuse to sign into law an amendment that has been approved in a referendum.

Ordinary referendums

Article 27 of the Irish constitution provides for a referendum on an ordinary bill, known as an 'ordinary referendum'. Article 47 states that for such a referendum to successfully veto the bill, it must be voted down by both a majority of votes cast and at least 33 and one-third per cent of registered voters, otherwise it is deemed to have passed.

An ordinary referendum can occur in two circumstances. First, if a bill is simply passed in the ordinary manner with a provision that it be sent to referendum. Second, a bill that, in the opinion of the President, "is of such national importance that the will of the people ought to be ascertained" if requested to do so by a majority of Seanad Éireann and a third of Dáil Éireann. Article 27 was intended for bills that were particularly contentious, controversial or of high importance. Despite there having been many bills fitting these criteria, article 27 has never been used.

=== Italy ===
The constitution of Italy provides for two kinds of binding referendums.

A legislative referendum can be called in order to abrogate a law totally or partially, if requested by 500,000 electors or five regional councils. This kind of referendum is valid only if at least a majority of electors goes to the polling station. It is forbidden to call a referendum regarding financial laws or laws relating to pardons or the ratification of international treaties.

A constitutional referendum can be called in order to approve a constitutional law or amendment only when it has been approved by the Houses (Chamber of Deputies and Senate of the Republic) with a majority of less than two thirds in both or either House, and only at the request of one fifth of the members of either House, or 500,000 electors or five Regional Councils. A constitutional referendum is valid no matter how many electors go to the polling station. Any citizen entitled to vote in an election to the Chamber of Deputies may participate in a referendum.

=== Latvia ===
The Constitution of Latvia prescribes a referendum for five purposes:

- recalling of the Parliament
- acceding to the European Union
- accepting substantial changes in the terms regarding the membership in the European Union
- accepting legislation suspended by the president
- amending the Constitution or adopting a law

One tenth of registered voters has the right to initiate a national referendum regarding recalling of the Parliament. Voter turnout needed is two thirds of the number of the voters who participated in the last elections for the Parliament.

Substantial changes in the terms regarding the membership of Latvia in the European Union shall be decided by a national referendum if such referendum is requested by at least one-half of the members of the Parliament.

A referendum will be held on a law if a President suspends it, and in a two-month period one tenth of the electorate requests a referendum, except if the Parliament again adopts the law with three three-quarters super-majority. Voter turnout needed is 50% of the number of the voters who participated in the last elections for the Parliament.

The constitution limits issues which can be submitted to a referendum. It forbids issues like budget, taxes, military conscription, declaration of war, peace treaties, agreements with other nations, etc.; according to the Constitutional Court of Latvia, the intent of initiators to organise a referendum cannot entail repeal of ‘the principle of wholeness of the Constitution of Latvia’ that ‘prohibits interpretation of separate norms of the Constitution of Latvia as isolated from the other Constitution of Latvia norms, because the Constitution of Latvia as a document, which is a cohesive whole, influences the contents and sense of the norm’; this means that at least the basic human rights and general principles of law listed in the Constitution of Latvia—such as the right of minorities to preserve and develop their language and their ethnic and cultural identity, the rights of a child, and the right to equality and non-discrimination, not to mention the principles of proportionality, legal certainty, and legitimate expectations —have to be honoured in the interpretation of all proposed amendments

One tenth of the electorate can request amendment of the Constitution adoption of a law. Absolute majority is required for such a referendum to pass. The exception is decision regarding substantial changes in the terms regarding membership in the EU - those measures need voter turnout of 50% of the number of the voters who participated in the last elections for the Parliament.

There were 13 referendums in Latvia's history, of that 4 in 1923 - 1934 period and 9 since 1991.

=== Lithuania ===
Lithuania has held 12 referendums since 1991. 300,000 signatures are needed to initiate a referendum.

=== Luxembourg ===
The Constitution of Luxembourg mentions the referendum in Article 51: "Voters will be asked to vote by way of referendum in the cases and under the conditions determined by law." The only details about execution of referendums are found in Article 114 which deals with constitutional amendments. There are no other provisions regarding referendums in Luxembourg.

The referendum on constitutional amendment (defined in Article 114) is binding. Referendums in general (defined in Article 51) are not explicitly stated to be binding.

There were four referendums in Luxembourg since 1919:

- the referendum on head of state and economic union in 1919
- the referendum on banning the Communist party in 1937
- European Constitution referendum in 2005
- the referendum on election rules in 2015

=== Malta ===
There are three types of referendums in Malta: constitutional, consultative and abrogative referendums.

Constitutional referendums are required by article 66(3) of the Constitution of Malta. While binding, it is limited to the single instance of amending the Constitutional provision on the maximum parliamentary term of five years. This type of referendum has never taken place.

The other categories of referendums are regulated by the Referenda Act. "Consultative" referendums (the Act does not use the term) can either take place prior to the assent of a bill in the House of Representatives or following the parliamentary procedure in a form of a conditional clause in the said bill. In the former case it would not legally bind Parliament to approve the said legislation irrelevant of the result of the said referendum, however the latter case, it would be conventionally binding on the president to promulgate the bill into law. There has been five referendums like this on a national level, one on a regional level (1973 Gozo Civic Council referendum) and a number of local referendums organised by single Local Councils.

An abrogative referendum has never been held and, if invoked and successful, can abrogate pieces of legislation barring some exceptions, notably financial and constitutional law.

=== Moldova ===
According to Article 75 of the Constitution of Moldova, "(1) Problems of utmost gravity or urgency confronting the Moldovan society or State shall be resolved by referendum. (2) The decisions passed in consequence of the results produced by the republican referendum have supreme judicial power." There were four referendums held in Moldova, in 1994, 1999, 2010 and 2019.

=== Netherlands ===
Since 1 July 2015, most laws can be subjected to a consultative referendum after their approval by the States General, following a request by 300,000 people.

Before that date, in principle, there was no permanent provision in law for a referendum. However, from 2002 until 2005, there was a Temporary Referendum Law in place, which allowed for non-binding referendums, known in Dutch as Volksraadpleging ("People's Consultation"), to be organised for laws already approved by the House of Representatives. No referendum was called based on this law.

In order to hold the 2005 referendum on the Treaty establishing a Constitution for Europe, a different law was temporarily put in place. That referendum was the first national referendum in the Netherlands in 200 years (1805 Batavian Republic constitutional referendum), and it was the result of an initiative proposal by parliamentarians Farah Karimi (GroenLinks), Niesco Dubbelboer (Labour) and Boris van der Ham (Democrats 66).

The 2016 Dutch Ukraine–European Union Association Agreement referendum is the second most recent Dutch referendum; the 2018 Dutch Intelligence and Security Services Act referendum was held in March 2018.

On 18 February 2018 the option for a non-binding referendum was repealed.

Since 29 January 2019 there have been four attempts to introduce a corrective referendum, which would give the citizens of the Netherlands an option to have a referendum to cancel a new law that has already been accepted by the House of Representatives and the Senate. The first three attempts have failed due to its requirement of a two-third approval rate in both chambers and political parties VVD, CDA and SGP being against the corrective referendum. The fourth attempt is currently ongoing.

=== Norway ===
The Norwegian Constitution does not mention referendums at all, and as such, referendums are not a part of Norwegian political practice. However, six advisory referendums have been held in Norway, most notably, the referendums on Norwegian EU membership, and the referendum for dissolving the union with Sweden. It is worth noting that these referendums, and potential future referendums, although legitimate as part of Norwegian constitutional convention, will not have any legal binding: They will merely be advisory, and the final decision will be taken by the Norwegian parliament, who may choose (albeit unlikely) to disregard the will of the Norwegian people as expressed through the referendum.

=== Poland ===
Several referendums have been held in modern Polish history:

- in 1996:
  - General property enfranchisement of citizens referendum
  - Referendum about certain ways of use of public property
- in 1997 - Referendum on the Constitution
- in 2003 - Referendum on joining the EU
- in 2015 - Referendum on single-member constituencies
- in 2023 - Privatization, retirement age, barrier, migration, alongside the parliamentary election

A referendum on a proposed EU constitution was planned in 2005, but has been put on hold after the rejection of constitution by French voters.

=== Portugal ===
The referendum in Portugal is called by the president of Portugal (if they so decide), on a proposal submitted by the Assembly or the Government. Referendums are binding if turnout is higher than 50% of registered voters. Citizens of Portugal have the right to submit to the Assembly an initiative for a referendum.

The referendum can be held only on "important issues concerning the national interest". The referendum cannot be held on amendments to the Constitution, and some issues such as budget and competences of the Assembly.

There have been three referendums in modern Portugal:

- abortion referendum of 1998
- regionalisation referendum of 1998
- abortion referendum of 2007

All three referendums had turnouts of less than 50%, which meant they were not binding. Nonetheless, the winning option on all three referendums was honoured by the governments of the time.

=== Romania ===
The Constitution of Romania defines that a referendum has to be called to suspend the president from office, or amend the Constitution. Moreover, a referendum can be called on matters of national interest by the president of Romania after consultation with Parliament.

There have been 8 referendums in post-communist Romania, and one at the county level:

- 2 constitutional referendums: in 1991 and 2003
- 2 presidential impeachment referendums: in May 2007 and in 2012
- voting system referendum in November 2007
- parliamentary reform referendum in 2009
- referendum regarding the definition of family and another one only in the Olt County to rename it to "Olt-Romanați County" in 2018 at the same time
- referendum about justice and corruption in 2019

=== Russia ===
The Russian Constitution of 1993 was adopted by a controversial referendum.

Popular referendum can be called by two millions registered voters, provided they do so from at least 42 separate regions of Russia within two months, with no more than 50,000 signatures collected in any single region. The question must first be approved by the Central Election Commission.

==== Ingushetia ====
The referendum was held on 30 November 1991 in Ingushetia on creation of the Ingush Republic within the Russian Federation amidst the Chechen secession.

=== Serbia ===
The Constitution of the Republic of Serbia was adopted on a referendum held in 28–29 October 2006. The constitutional referendum passed with 3,521,724 voting a 53.04% majority. 3,645,517 or 54.91% voted on the referendum, which made it legitimate.

=== Slovenia ===
There was an independence referendum in Slovenia on 23 December 1990. The turnout was 93.3% of all voters, of which 94.8% cast a vote in support of independence. It was the first such referendum in one of the then Yugoslavian republics. The results were announced on 26 December, and on 25 June 1991, the Slovenian parliament passed an independence law proclaiming Slovenia a sovereign country. This was followed by the Ten-Day War, in which Slovenian forces drove the Yugoslav People's Army out of the country. In 2015, Slovenia held another referendum on a bill legalizing same-sex marriage, which was rejected by the majority of voters.

=== Spain ===
In a referendum in Spain (Referéndum para la reforma política, lit. 'Referendum for political reform') on 15 December 1976, after the death of Francisco Franco, 94% of voters approved a Political Reform Bill to establish democracy. On 6 December 1978 a further referendum was held to approve a new Constitution. Spaniards chose (91.8% of voters) to approve the Constitution. Also, in 1986 another referendum approved Spain's membership of NATO.

=== Sweden ===
The Constitution of Sweden provides for both binding and non-binding referendums. Since the introduction of parliamentary democracy, six referendums have been held: the first was about alcohol prohibition in 1922, and the most recent was about euro membership in 2003. All have been non-binding, consultative referendums. Two, in 1957 and 1980, were multiple-choice referendums.

=== Switzerland ===
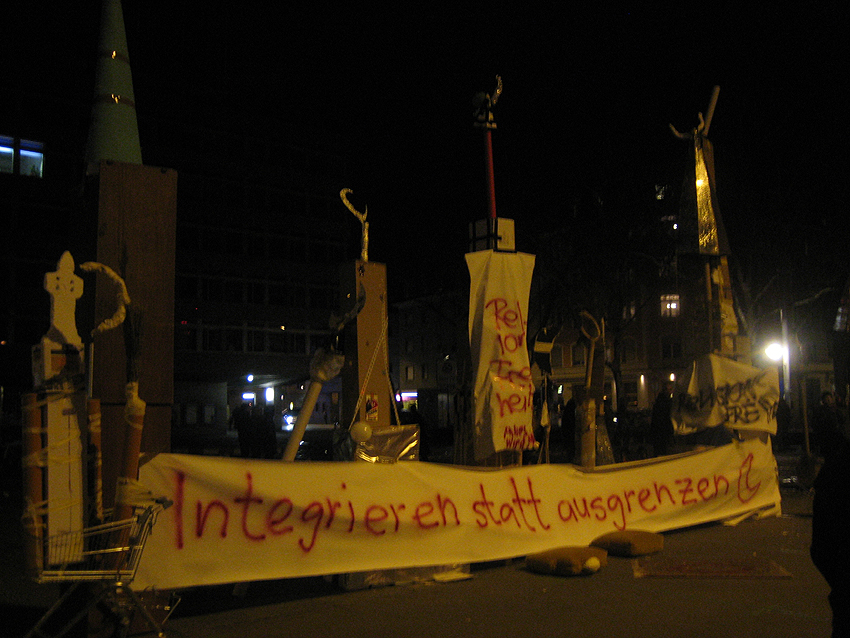
Demonstration in Zurich to vote against a referendum which banned minarets.

In Switzerland, Swiss voters can demand a binding referendum at federal, cantonal, and municipal level. They are a central feature of Swiss political life. It is not the government's choice whether or when a referendum is held, but it is a legal procedure regulated by the Swiss constitution. There are two types of referendums:

- Optional referendum: Any federal law, certain other federal resolutions, and international treaties that are ongoing in nature, or any change to Swiss law may be subject to referendum if at least 50,000 people or eight cantons have petitioned to do so within 100 days. Within cantons and municipalities, the required number of people is smaller, and there may be additional causes for a facultative referendum, e.g., expenditures that exceed a certain amount of money. The facultative referendum is the most common type of referendum, and it is mostly carried out by political parties or by interest groups.
- Mandatory referendum: There must be a referendum on any amendments to the constitution and on any joining of a multinational community or organization for collective security. In many municipalities, expenditures that exceed a certain amount of money also are subject to the obligatory referendum. Constitutional amendments are proposed by the parliament or by the cantons or by federal popular initiative. Citizen's initiatives at the federal level need to collect 100,000 valid signatures within 18 months, and must not contradict international laws or treaties. Often, parliament elaborates a counter-proposal to an initiative, leading to a multiple-choice referendum. Very few such initiatives pass the vote, but more often, the parliamentary counter proposal is approved.

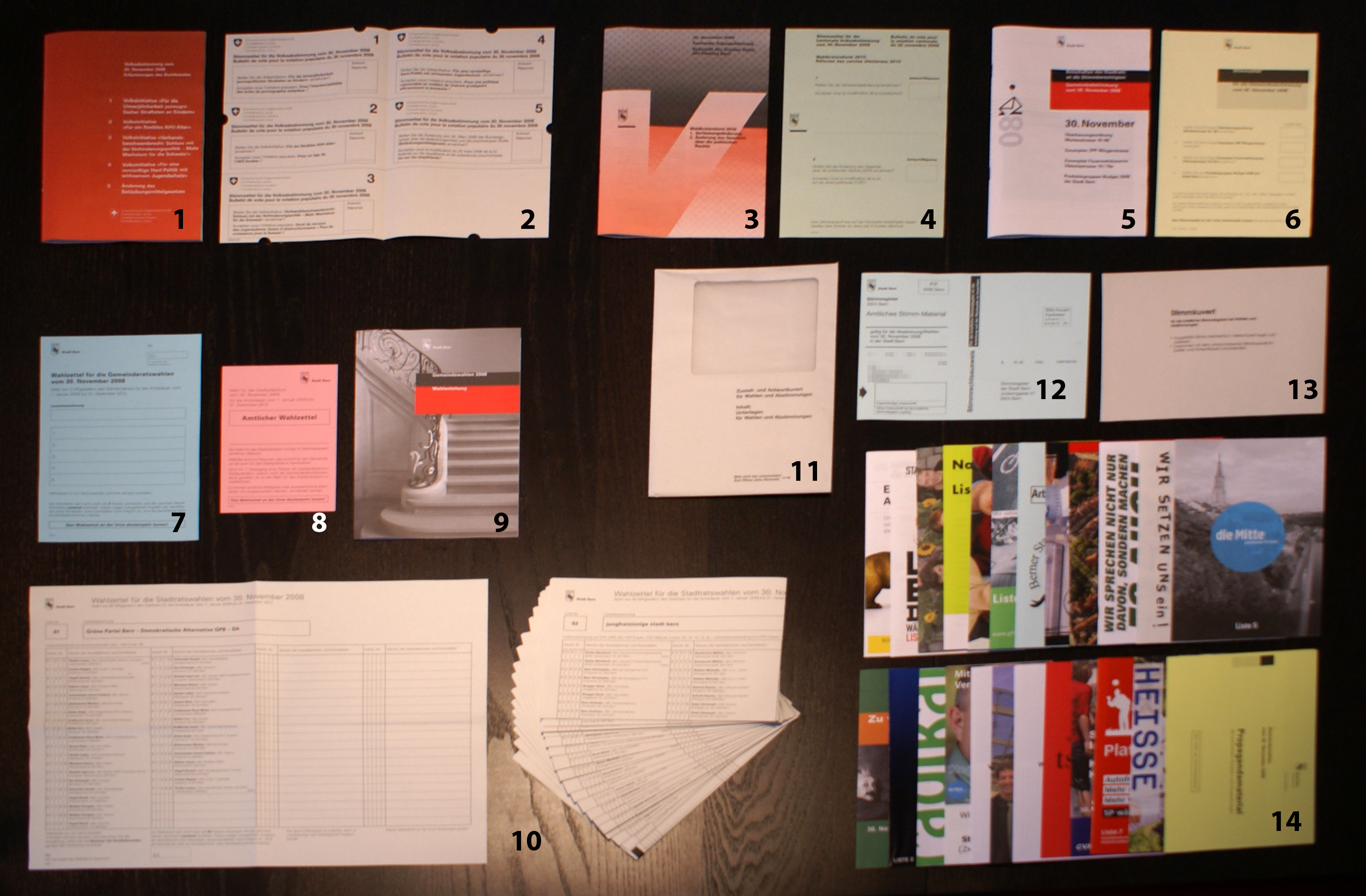
The extensive, official voting and election material regularly sent to every citizen each time – usually four times a year – compromising the pros and cons by all political proponents; here, to Berne's citizen in November 2008 about 5 national, 2 cantonal, 4 municipal referendums, and 2 elections (government and parliament of the City of Berne).

The possibility of facultative referendums forces the parliament to search for a compromise between the major interest groups. In many cases, the mere threat of a facultative referendum or of an initiative is enough to make the parliament adjust a law.

The referendums are said, by their adversaries, to slow politics down. On the other hand, empirical scientists, e.g. Bruno S. Frey among many, show that this and other instruments of citizens' participation, direct democracy, contribute to stability and happiness.

The votes on referendums are always held on a weekend (the voting's official date is set to Sundays), typically three or four times a year, and in most cases, the votes concern several referendums at the same time, usually at different political levels (federal, cantonal, municipal) about several different subjects. Referendums are also often combined with elections. Voter turnout is around 40% to 50%, unless there is an election or the subject of a referendum is of a critical nature. The decisions made in referendums tend to be conservative. Citizens' initiatives are usually not passed. The federal rule and referendums have been regularly used in Switzerland since its inauguration as a modern state: almost 600 national votes have been held since 1848.

=== Ukraine ===
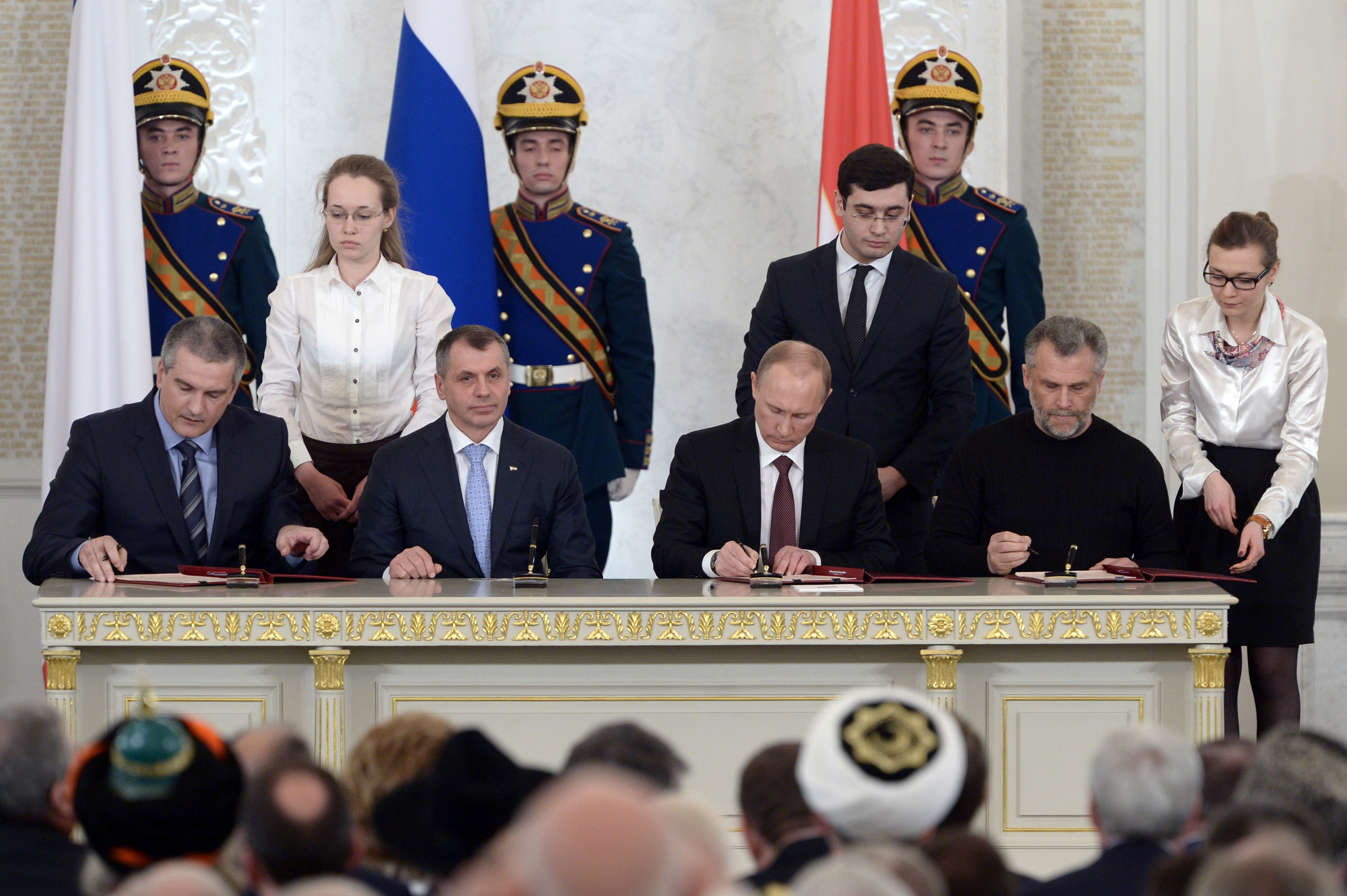
Vladimir Putin (third, left), Sergey Aksyonov (first, left), Vladimir Konstantinov (second, left) and Aleksei Chalyi (right) sign the Treaty on Accession of the Republic of Crimea to Russia

The Crimean status referendum, 2014 was a referendum on the status of Crimea held on March 16, 2014, by the legislature of Autonomous Republic of Crimea as well as by the local government of Sevastopol, both subdivisions of Ukraine at the time. The referendum asked the people of Crimea whether they wanted to join Russia as a federal subject, or if they wanted to restore the 1992 Crimean constitution and Crimea's status as a part of Ukraine.

The available choices did not include keeping the status quo of Crimea and Sevastopol as they were at the moment the referendum was held. The 1992 constitution accords greater powers to the Crimean parliament including full sovereign powers to establish relations with other states, therefore many commentators argued that both provided referendum choices would result in de facto separation from Ukraine.

Supreme Council of Crimea considered the ousting of Ukrainian President Viktor Yanukovych in the 2014 Ukrainian revolution as a coup and the new interim government in Kyiv as illegitimate and stated that the referendum is a response to these developments. The referendum was regarded as illegitimate by most countries including all European Union members, the United States and Canada because of the events surrounding it including the plebiscite being held while the peninsula was occupied by Russian soldiers. Thirteen members of the United Nations Security Council voted in favor of a resolution declaring the referendum invalid, but Russia vetoed it and China abstained. A United Nations General Assembly resolution was later adopted, by a vote of 100 in favor vs. 11 against with 58 abstentions, which declared the referendum invalid and affirmed Ukraine's territorial integrity. The Mejlis of the Crimean Tatar People called for a boycott of the referendum.

Russia officially recognized the results of the Crimean referendum and claims that unilateral Kosovo declaration of independence has set a precedent, which allows secession of Crimea from Ukraine. Such parallels are disputed by Western scholars, however.

The official result from the Autonomous Republic of Crimea was a 96.77 percent vote for integration of the region into the Russian Federation with an 83.1 percent voter turnout. The Mejlis Deputy Chairman Akhtem Chiygoz stated that the actual turnout could not have exceed 30–40 percent, whilst former Russian government adviser Andrey Illarionov stated that the actual support for the reunification of Crimea with Russia was about 34 percent, citing results of previous polls over past three years. However, according to the Gallup's survey performed on 21–27 April, 82.8% of Crimean people consider the referendum results reflecting most Crimeans’ views, and 73.9% of Crimeans say Crimea's becoming part of Russia will make life better for themselves and their families, just 5.5% disagree.

Following the referendum, Supreme Council of Crimea and Sevastopol City Council declared independence of Crimea from Ukraine and requested to join the Russian Federation. On the same day, Russia recognized Crimea as a sovereign state.

=== United Kingdom ===
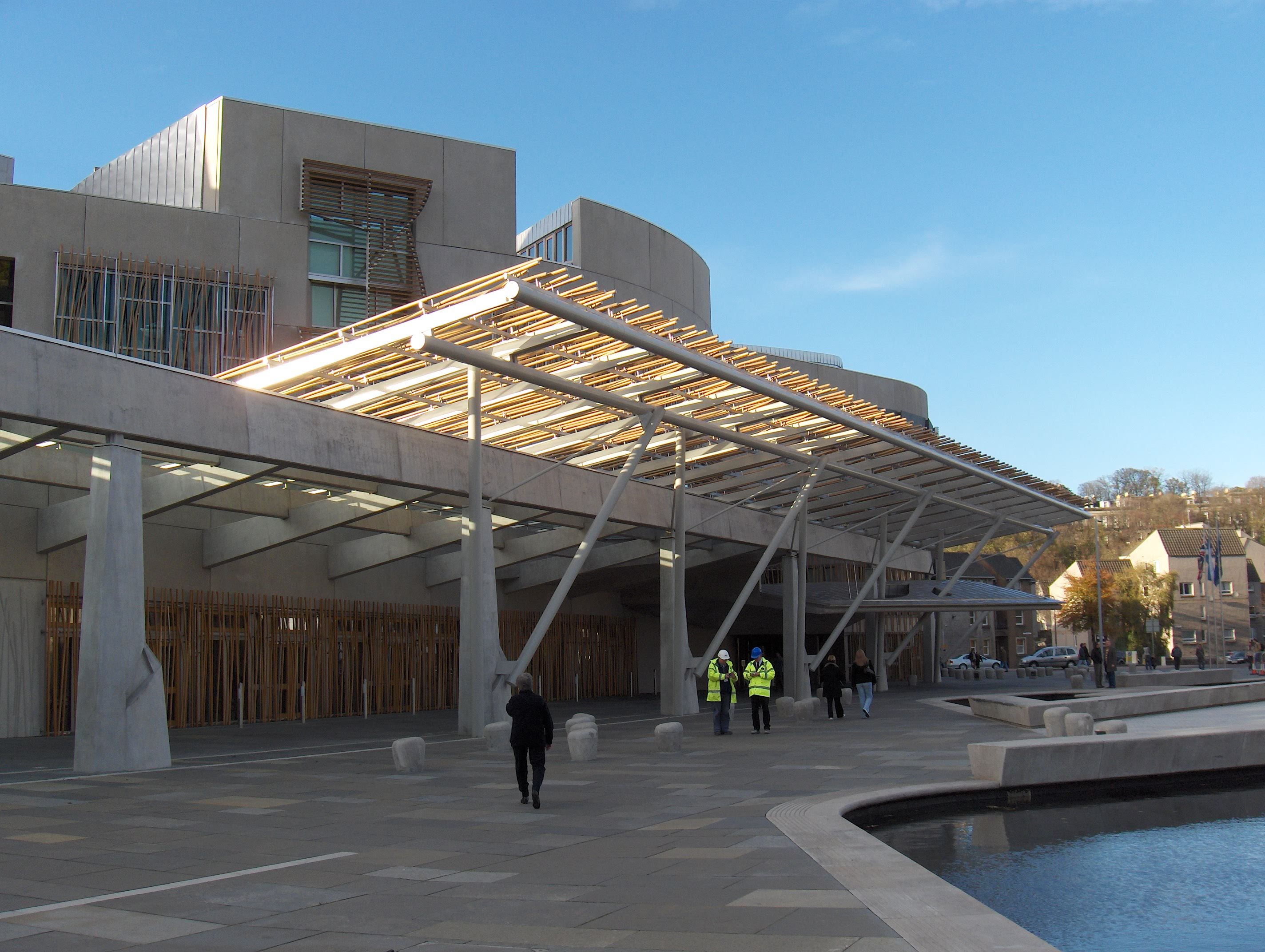
The Scottish Parliament was created through the 1997 Scottish devolution referendum.

Although acts of Parliament may permit referendums to take place, the doctrine of parliamentary sovereignty means any act of Parliament giving effect to a referendum result could be reversed by a subsequent act of Parliament. As a result, referendums in the United Kingdom cannot be constitutionally binding, although they will usually have a persuasive political effect.

Major referendums are rare; only three have been put to the entire UK electorate. The first was the 1975 United Kingdom European Communities membership referendum, which was held two years after British accession to the European Economic Community to gauge support for continued membership. The second was the 2011 United Kingdom Alternative Vote referendum. This was to vote on changing the 'First Past the Post' system to an alternative Electoral System, the Alternative Vote.

Referendums have been held in individual parts of the United Kingdom on issues relating to devolution in Scotland and Wales, an elected Mayor of London and a Greater London Authority for Greater London, a regional assembly for the North-East of England and the constitutional status and governance of Northern Ireland. Since 1973, the year of the first such plebiscite, there have been nine major referendums.

In 2004, Her Majesty's Government promised a UK-wide referendum on the new European Constitution, but this was postponed in 2005 following the defeats of the French and Dutch referendums. Due to the replacement of the European Constitution with the Treaty of Lisbon, there was no obligation for a referendum. Referendums have also been proposed, but not held, on the replacement of the pound sterling with the euro as the currency of the United Kingdom.

A national referendum was held in Scotland on the 18th of September 2014. Voters were asked to answer Yes or No to the question: "Should Scotland be an independent country?" to which 55% of Scots voted "No".

At the local level, the government has put proposals for directly elected mayors to 37 local authority areas by referendum. The Local Government Act 1972 also contains a little-used provision that allows non-binding local referendums on any issue to be called by small groups of voters. Strathclyde Regional Council held a postal referendum in 1994 on whether control of water and sewerage services should be transferred to appointed boards: this was largely a political tactic, since this was the policy of the UK Government at the time. The UK Parliament enacted the legislation anyway, and it came into force on 1 April 1996.

On Thursday 23 June 2016 a third UK-wide referendum was held on the issue of the United Kingdom's continuing membership of the European Union 41 years after the first referendum. The referendum was called by the Prime Minister David Cameron and Her Majesty's Government after an agreement was struck with the European Union which renegotiated the membership of the United Kingdom. This referendum, with a turnout of 72.21%, resulted in a majority voting to leave the EU by 52% of votes as opposed to 48% of votes who voted to remain, causing unprecedented ramifications both within the UK and internationally, and forced the resignation of David Cameron.

== North America ==
=== Canada ===
Referendums are rare in Canada and only three have ever occurred at the federal level: 1898 on Prohibition, 1942 on WWII conscription, and 1992 on the Charlottetown Accord. Although the Constitution of Canada does not expressly require that amendments be approved by referendum, many argue that, in light of the precedent set by the Charlottetown Accord referendum, this may have become a constitutional convention.

A referendum can also occur at the provincial level. The 1980 and 1995 referendums on the secession of Québec are notable cases. In conjunction with the provincial election in 2007, the province of Ontario voted on a mixed-member proportional representation electoral system and British Columbia held two consecutive referendums on BC-STV in 2005 and 2009. In 2011 British Columbia held yet another referendum against a newly imposed HST tax. The results ended up making British Columbia the first province to overturn the harmonization of provincial and federal taxes, joining it with Alberta, which not having a provincial sales tax, has never participated in the HST. A referendum was held in the Canadian province of Prince Edward Island on November 28, 2005, to determine whether or not to adopt the Mixed Member Proportional Representation System. The referendum failed.

=== Mexico ===
A law allowing consulta popular ("popular consultation") was passed on March 14, 2014. Such a consultation may be requested by the president, 33% of the Chamber of Deputies, the Senate, or 2% of voters.

A series of unofficial consultations have also been held in 2018 and 2019:

- November 24–25, 2018, Isthmus of Tehuantepec train. 90.3% of participants approved.
- November 24–25, 2018, Mayan Train. 946,081 people voted (1% of the population); 89.9% in favor. Another consultation will take place on December 15, 2019.
- November 24–25, 2018, refinery in Dos Bocas, Tabasco. 91.6% of voters approved the project.
- November 24–25, 2018, social programs. Seven programs were approved by over 90% of voters.
- February 23–24, 2019, Thermo-electric plant in Morelos. 55,715 people voted in Morelos, Puebla, and Tlaxcala. The plant was approved.
- October 27–28, 2018, construction of a new airport for Mexico City. 1,067,859 votes were cast, 29% in favor of the Texcoco Airport and 69.5% in favor of the Santa Lucia Airport.
- July 21, 2019, term (2 or 5 years) of the Governor of Baja California. 1.89% of eligible voters participated, and 84% approved the 5-year term.

=== United States ===
There is no provision for the holding of referendums at the federal level in the United States, which the Constitution does not provide for.

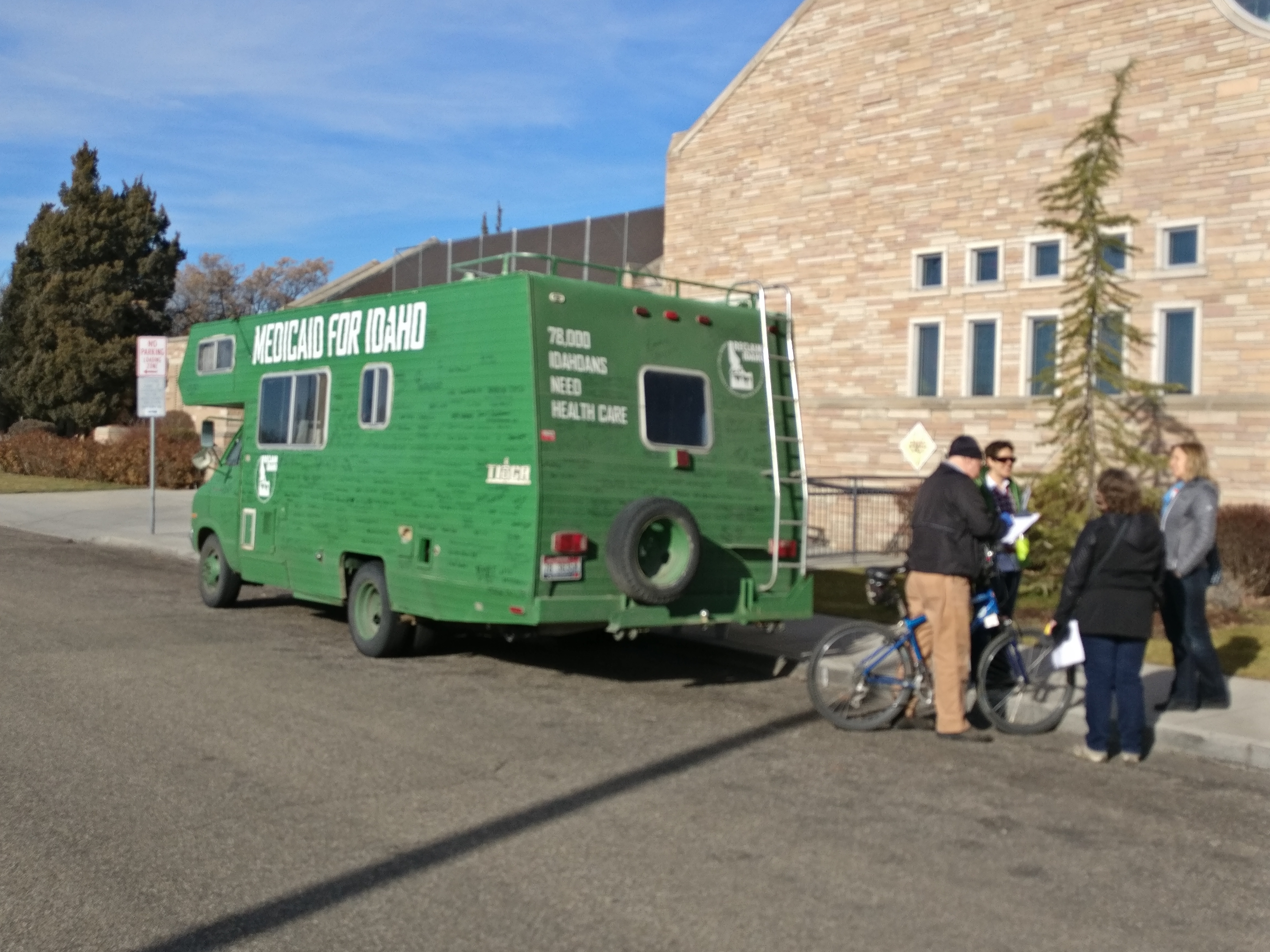
An initiative canvassing campaign, Medicaid for Idaho, to put Medicaid expansion on the ballot; the Methodist Cathedral of the Rockies hosted the volunteers

However, 24 states (principally in the West, but also in Eastern states, such as Massachusetts) and many local and city governments provide for referendums and citizen's initiatives. Such state-level referendums, as an example, have resulted in the limitation of property taxes as with California's Proposition 13 and Massachusetts' Proposition 2½ in the late 20th century. This type of referendum is frequently known as a “ballot measure,” a “proposition,” or simply a “question.”

In the United States ballot measures may be established by several different processes which vary amongst the states:

- Initiative, in which any citizen or organization may gather a predetermined number of signatures to qualify a measure for the ballot;
- Popular referendum, in which a predetermined number of signatures (typically lower than the number required for an initiative) qualifies a ballot measure repealing a specific act of the legislature;
- Legislative referral (a.k.a. "legislative referendum"), in which the legislature puts proposed legislation up for popular vote (either voluntarily or, in the case of a constitutional amendment as a required procedure).
- Recall election, in which voters can remove an elected official from office through a direct vote before that official's term has ended

== Central and South America ==
=== Brazil ===
Three nationwide referendums have been held so far in Brazilian history.

In 1963, the country had just adopted the parliamentary government system, but in a referendum held in 1963, the Brazilian population was consulted about which government system should be enacted in the country and it was decided to have Brazil return to a Presidential system.

In 1993, another referendum to decide Brazil's government system was held. Voters could choose to keep the presidential republic system, adopt a parliamentary republic system, or adopt a parliamentary monarchy system. The majority of voters opined to maintain the current presidential government system.

In 2005 a referendum was held to consult the population about their opinion on the possibility of forbidding the sale and civilian possession of firearms and ammunition nationwide. This referendum was offered by the government as part of a violence minimization initiative known as project disarmament. Most voters declared themselves contrary to the ban and the laws regarding commerce and ownership of weapons in the country remained unaltered.

=== Chile ===
There have been six plebiscites and one "consultation" in Chilean history. In 1925, a plebiscite was held over a new constitution that would replace a semi-parliamentary system with a presidential one. The "Yes" vote won overwhelmingly, with 95% of the vote.

In 1978, after the United Nations protested against Pinochet's régime, the country's military government held a national consultation, which asked if people supported Pinochet's rule. The "Yes" vote won with 74%, although the results have been questioned.

Another constitutional plebiscite was held in 1980. The "Yes" won with 68.5%, prolonging Pinochet's term until 1989 and replacing the 1925 Constitution with a new one still used today. The results of this plebiscite have also been questioned by Pinochet's opponents, because of the lack of voters registration.

In a historical plebiscite held in 1988, 56% voted to end the military régime. The next year, yet another plebiscite was held for constitutional changes for the transition to a democratic government (the "Yes" vote won with 91%).

A referendum held in 2020 after waves of popular protests in 2019 approved the drafting of a new constitution, with 78,28% voting in favour. In September 2022, the proposed left-wing document was rejected, 62% to 38%. Following a second process, in December 2023, a proposed right-wing replacement was rejected, 55.8% to 44.2%. These outcomes guaranteed the validity and effectiveness of the 1980 Charter.

There have been several referendums in individual municipalities in Chile since the return to civilian rule in 1990. A referendum, which took place in 2006 in Las Condes, over the construction of a mall was noteworthy for being the first instance in Chilean history where electronic voting machines were used.

=== Costa Rica ===
The first referendum held in Costa Rica was October 7, 2007, to approve or reject the free trade agreement with Central America, Dominican Republic (Costa Rica already has FTAs with the latter) and the United States known as the Dominican Republic – Central America Free Trade Agreement (DR-CAFTA).

It was very narrowly approved (49.030 votes). Results were 51.62% voted in favour and 48.38% against it. It is currently the only free trade agreement in the world that has been approved on a referendum.

From 2008 to 2010 conservative groups, linked to religious institutions, managed to collect 150,000 signatures to call a referendum to decline unions between same-sex couples. The Supreme Elections Tribunal (TSE) had scheduled the consultation on December 5, 2010.

However, the Constitutional Chamber of the Supreme Court rejected the referendum stating that "The rights of minorities that arise from anti-majoritarian claims can not be subjected to a referendum process which the majority imposes". This consideration supports the main argument of those who rejected the consultation considered a violation of human rights, among these gay groups and humanitarian actors.

The Board further considered that "people who have sex with same sex are a group at disadvantage and discrimination, which requires the support of public authorities for the recognition of their constitutional rights or other legislation". Decisions of the Constitutional Court are final so the ruling stopped the referendum and opened to the Congress the opportunity to continue discussing the bill on the recognition of homosexual unions.

=== Puerto Rico ===
Seven Puerto Rican status referendums (in 1967, 1993, 1998, 2012, 2017, 2020, 2024) have taken place in Puerto Rico to determine whether the insular area should become an independent nation (comprising a republic and an associated republic), apply for statehood, or maintain commonwealth (Estado Libre Asociado) status. Remaining a commonwealth has been the result of the first three referendums. The fourth referendum resulted in a majority being pro-statehood. There was also a 2005 referendum (Resolution 64) to determine whether the Legislative Assembly of Puerto Rico should be restructured (among other changes to become unicameral).

=== Uruguay ===
The Uruguayan constitution allows citizens to challenge laws approved by Parliament by use of a referendum or to propose changes to the Constitution by the use of a plebiscite. This right has been used a few times in the past 15 years: in 1989, to confirm or reject an amnesty to members of the military who violated human rights during the military regime (1973–1985); in 1989, to increase pensioners' incomes; in 1992, to consider the partial privatization of public utilities companies; and, in 2004, to maintain water resources in government control.

=== Venezuela ===
The 1999 constitution of Venezuela, created by the Chávez government, and approved by referendum, brought in the concept of requiring referendums for constitutional changes, as well as providing for recall referendums of elected officials (which require petitions of a minimum percentage of voters to be submitted). In the Venezuelan recall referendum of 2004 voters determined whether or not Hugo Chávez, the former president of Venezuela, should be recalled from office. The result of the referendum was to not recall Chávez.

== Oceania ==
=== Australia ===
Approval in a referendum is necessary in order to amend the Australian constitution. A bill must first be passed by both houses of Parliament or, in certain limited circumstances, by only one house of Parliament, and is then submitted to a referendum. If a majority of those voting, as well as separate majorities in each of a majority of states (and where appropriate a majority of people in any affected state) vote in favor of the amendment, it is presented for Royal Assent, given in the King's name by the Governor-General.

=== New Zealand ===
New Zealand has two types of referendum. Government referendums are predominantly about constitutional issues. However, there are also referendums on other issues. Furthermore, constitutional issues, such as the establishment of the Supreme Court of New Zealand, may be done without a referendum. Government referendums can be binding or non-binding.

Since 1993, New Zealand also has provision for non-binding citizens-initiated referendums. To initiate a citizens-initiated referendum on a particular issue, proponents of the referendum apply to the Clerk of the House of Representatives, and once the question wording is determined, proponents have twelve months to compile a petition containing signatures from at least ten percent of all registered voters. Only five citizens-initiated referendums have gone to a vote: one in 1995, two in 1999, one in 2009 and another held in late 2013.

== Types of referendums by country ==
National popular referendums by country
Country	Type	Required signatures	Restrictions / Details	Conditions of validity	Result (if valid)
Argentina	Legislative	1,5% of the registered voters in at least 6 provinces	Not authorised on matters relating to constitutional reforms, international treaties, taxes, budget and criminal matters.	1,5% of the registered voters in at least 6 provinces	The initiative must be voted in favour or against by the Congress.
Albania	Abrogative	50,000 (≈1,5% of the registrants in 2017)	Constitutionality review. Prohibited against laws relating to the integrity of the territory of the Republic of North Macedonia, fundamental human rights and freedoms, the budget, taxes, the financial obligations of the State, declarations of establishment and termination of the state of emergency, declarations of war and peace, as well as amnesty laws	Absolute majority + one third of the registrants in favour	Binding
Bolivia	Legislative	20% of the registrants + 15% in each of the nine departments of Bolivia	Not authorized on subjects relating to the unity and integrity of Bolivia's territory, human rights, taxes, the country's internal and external security, the drafting of laws, the organization of institutions responsible for the protection of society and national defence, the nature of the state and its relations with decentralized entities.	Absolute majority	Restricted
Bolivia	Ratification of a treaty	5% of the registrants	Suspends ratification of the treaty in the meantime.	Absolute majority	Restricted
Bolivia	Constitutional	20% of the registrants	Only once per concurrent term of office of the meeting and the president, which is five years.	Absolute majority	Restricted
Bulgaria	Legislative	400,000 in three months (≈5,7 % of the registrants in 2017)	Not authorised on matters relating to Articles 84, 91, 103, 103, 130, 132 and 147 of the Constitution, taxes, duties, taxes and contributions to social security, the state budget, the internal organisation of the National Assembly, the entirety of a code of law and international treaties, if they have already been ratified.	Absolute majority + Higher participation than in recent legislative elections	Binding
Colombia	Abrogative	10% of the registrants in six months	Not allowed against laws relating to the state budget, taxation, as well as the ratification of international treaties.	Absolute majority + 25% participation	Binding
Costa Rica	Legislative	5 % of the registrants in nine months	Only once a year Banned in the six months before and after a presidential election Not allowed on matters relating to the budget, taxation, monetary matters, pensions and public contracts and administrative acts.	Absolute majority + 30% participation	Binding
Costa Rica	Abrogative	5 % of the registrants in nine months	Only once a year Banned in the six months before and after a presidential election Not allowed on matters relating to the budget, taxation, monetary matters, pensions and public contracts and administrative acts.	Absolute majority + 30% participation	Binding
Costa Rica	Constitutional	5 % of the registrants in nine months	Only once a year Banned in the six months before and after a presidential election Not allowed on matters relating to the budget, taxation, monetary matters, pensions and public contracts and administrative acts.	Absolute majority of votes + 40% participation	Binding
Croatia	Legislative	10% of the registrants within two weeks	Constitutionality review by the Constitutional Court if requested by the Parliament.	Absolute majority	Binding
Croatia	Abrogative	10% of the registrants within two weeks	Constitutionality review by the Constitutional Court if requested by the Parliament.	Absolute majority	Binding
Croatia	Constitutional	10% of the registrants within two weeks	Constitutionality review by the Constitutional Court if requested by the Parliament.	Absolute majority	Binding
Ecuador	Legislative	5 % of enrollees in six months	Constitutionality review. Unauthorized on matters relating to taxation and the political and administrative structure of the state.	Absolute majority	Binding
Ecuador	Abrogative	5 % of enrollees in six months	Constitutionality review. Unauthorized on matters relating to taxation and the political and administrative structure of the state.	Absolute majority	Binding
Ecuador	Revocatory	15% of the registrants in six months	Unlike the president. May only be convened once during his term of office. Cannot be done in the first or last year of the mandate.	Absolute majority of all valid, blank and invalid votes	Binding
Ecuador	Constitutional	8% of the registrants in six months	Constitutionality review. May not have as its object a change in the nature of the state or its decentralized elements, affect the rights guaranteed by the constitution, or change the procedure for amending the constitution	Absolute majority	Binding
Ecuador	Constituent	12% of the registrants in six months	Convene a constituent assembly. The proposal must include the voting system that will be used to elect or select the members of the constituency as well as the general framework of the electoral process. The new constitution prepared by the constituent assembly will in turn have to be put to a referendum.	Absolute majority	Binding
Hungary	Legislative	200,000 (≈2,5 % of the registrants in 2018)	Authorised only in areas falling within the scope of the National Assembly, from which projects relating to constitutional amendments, the State budget, national taxes, pension or health insurance contributions, customs duties and general rules on local taxes are also excluded, national and local electoral systems, international treaties, the dissolution of the National Assembly or local assemblies, the declaration of a state of war, a state of siege or a state of emergency, as well as the proclamation and extension of a state of preventive defence, military operations and amnesty laws.	Absolute majority + 50% participation	Binding
Hungary	Abrogative	200,000 (≈2,5 % of the registrants in 2018)		Absolute majority + 50% participation	Binding
Italy	Abrogative	500,000 (≈1 % of the registrants in 2018)	Constitutionality review. Not allowed against laws relating to taxation, budget, amnesty, remission of sentences and ratification of international treaties.	Absolute majority + 50% participation	Binding
Kenya	Constitutional	1,000,000 (≈5,1 % of the registrants in 2017)	Requires the support of at least one of the 47 county assemblies if the proposal does not address the supremacy of the constitution over any other law, territorial integrity, popular sovereignty, national values and principles of governance referred to in Article 10, the Bill of Rights, the mandate of the President, the independence of the judiciary, the powers of parliament, the structure of decentralized entities and the same procedure for constitutional review	Absolute majority + 50% participation in at least half of the counties	Binding
Latvia	Legislative	10% of the registrants	Not authorized on matters relating to the state budget, taxes, duties, duties, loans and obligations, railway tariffs, military conscription, declarations of war, peace treaties, declaration of the beginning and end of the state of emergency, mobilization and demobilization, as well as international treaties. The parliament may decide to adopt the popular proposal itself, in which case the referendum does not take place.	Absolute majority + Higher participation than in recent legislative elections	Binding
Latvia	Constitutional	10% of the registrants	Not authorized on matters relating to the state budget, taxes, duties, duties, loans and obligations, railway tariffs, military conscription, declarations of war, peace treaties, declaration of the beginning and end of the state of emergency, mobilization and demobilization, as well as international treaties. The parliament may decide to adopt the popular proposal itself, in which case the referendum does not take place.	Absolute majority + 50% participation	Binding
Liechtenstein	Legislative	1,000 in six weeks (≈5 % of the registrants in 2017)	None. However, the parliament may decide to vote the bill itself, in which case the referendum does not take place.	Absolute majority	Binding
Liechtenstein	Abrogative	1,000 in thirty days	This includes any legislative change, new one-time expenditure of more than 500,000 Swiss Francs or new annual expenditure of more than 250,000 Swiss Francs. The implementation of the referendum suspends their application at least until the results are promulgated.	Absolute majority	Binding
Liechtenstein	Constitutional	1,500 in six weeks (≈7,5% of enrolments in 2017)	None. However, the parliament may decide to vote for the amendment itself by two thirds of its total membership, in which case the referendum shall not take place. The deadline is thirty days if the referendum is intended to prevent a constitutional revision initiated by parliament. Also concerns international treaties and their ratification.	Absolute majority	Binding
Lithuania	Legislative	300,000 (≈12 % of the registrants in 2016)	Authorized only in matters within the scope of the meeting, the Seimas.	Absolute majority +1/3 of the registrants in favour + 50% participation	Binding
Malta	Abrogative	10% of the registrants	Constitutionality review. Prohibited against all or part of the Constitution as well as areas related to the treaties of the European Union or other international treaties, electoral law, tax legislation, as well as the organization of decentralized entities.	Absolute majority + 50% participation	Binding
Marshall Islands	Constituent	25% of the registrants	It concerns the convening of a Constitutional Convention to study the popular proposal to amend the Constitution.	Absolute majority	Binding
Mexico	Legislative	2% of the registrants in two years	Authorized only in areas under the jurisdiction of the Mexican Congress and deemed to be of "national importance", which is defined by law as having an impact on most of the country's territory and population. In addition, projects relating to a restriction of human rights enshrined in the Constitution, Article 40 defining the country as a representative, democratic, federal, free and sovereign republic and subjects relating to electoral law, the state budget, the organisation of national security and that of the army and its operations are excluded. The Supreme Court of Justice may rule on the constitutionality of the referendum proposal if the Congress so requests.	Absolute majority + 40% participation	Binding
Mexico	Abrogative	2% of the registrants in two years		Absolute majority + 40% participation	Binding
(Federated States of Micronesia) Micronesia	Constitutional	10% of the registrants in at least 3 of the 4 states.	If several contradictory amendments are adopted simultaneously, the one with the most votes shall prevail.	75% qualified majority in at least 3 of the 4 states	Binding
New Zealand	Legislative	10% of the registrants in twelve months	N/A	Absolute majority	Non binding
North Macedonia	Legislative	150,000 (≈8 % of the registrants in 2016)	Authorised only in areas falling within the scope of the Assembly.	Absolute majority + 50% participation	Binding
North Macedonia	Abrogative	150,000 (≈8 % of the registrants in 2016)	Authorised only in areas falling within the scope of the Assembly.	Absolute majority + 50% participation	Binding
(Palau) Palaos	Legislative	10% of the registrants	Authorized only in areas under the jurisdiction of the Federal Parliament. Must be held at the same time as the general elections, which are held every four years.	Absolute majority	Binding
(Palau) Palaos	Abrogative	10% of the registrants	Authorized only in areas under the jurisdiction of the Federal Parliament. Must be held at the same time as the general elections, which are held every four years.	Absolute majority	Binding
(Palau) Palaos	Constitutional	25% of the registrants	Must be held at the same time as the general elections, which are held every four years.	Absolute majority in at least 12 of the 16 [states of Palau].	Binding
Peru	Legislative	10% of the registrants	Excluded are projects relating to the restriction of fundamental rights of the individual, tax and budgetary matters, as well as international treaties already in force. In the event of a valid and favourable result, the parliament may only amend the law or the amendment once a period of two years has passed, except by holding a new referendum or by a two-thirds vote. In the event of a negative or invalid result, a new popular initiative cannot be implemented on the same subject as two years later.	Absolute majority + 30% of the registrants in favour	Binding
Peru	Abrogative	10% of the registrants		Absolute majority + 30% of the registrants in favour	Binding
Peru	Constitutional	10% of the registrants		Absolute majority + 30% of the registrants in favour	Binding
Philippines	Legislative	10% of the registrants + 3% in each of the legislative districts	The following topics cannot be passed via initiative: Petitions with more than one subject; Emergency measures	Absolute majority	Binding
Philippines	Abrogative	10% of the registrants + 3% in each of the legislative districts	The following topics cannot be passed via initiative: Petitions with more than one subject; Emergency measures	Absolute majority	Binding
Philippines	Constitutional	12% of the registrants + 3% in each of the legislative districts	Can only be initiated by the population once every five years, and for amendments only and not wholesale revisions.	Absolute majority	Binding
San Marino	Legislative	1.5% of the registrants in 45 days	Authorized in areas under the purview of Parliament, excluding projects against constitutional provisions, those relating to the state budget, taxes and taxation, amnesties, the right to vote, the right to work, freedom of movement and any other violation or restriction of human rights, as well as the ratification of international treaties	Absolute majority + 32% of the registrants in favour	Binding
San Marino	Abrogative	1.5% of the registrants in 90 days	Authorized in areas under the purview of Parliament, excluding projects against constitutional provisions, those relating to the state budget, taxes and taxation, amnesties, the right to vote, the right to work, freedom of movement and any other violation or restriction of human rights, as well as the ratification of international treaties	Absolute majority + 32% of the registrants in favour	Binding
Serbia	Legislative	100,000 in seven days (≈1,5% of the registrants in 2016)	Authorized only in areas within the competence of the National Assembly, to which projects relating to international treaties, human rights and freedoms, minority rights, tax legislation, the state budget, the declaration of a state of emergency, amnesty laws and the assembly's electoral law are also excluded	Absolute majority + 50% participation	Binding
Serbia	Abrogative	100,000 in seven days (≈1,5% of the registrants in 2016)	Authorized only in areas within the competence of the National Assembly, to which projects relating to international treaties, human rights and freedoms, minority rights, tax legislation, the state budget, the declaration of a state of emergency, amnesty laws and the assembly's electoral law are also excluded	Absolute majority + 50% participation	Binding
Slovakia	Legislative	350,000 (≈8 % of the registrants in 2016)	Constitutionality review by the Constitutional Court if the President so requests. Not allowed in areas relating to fundamental rights and freedoms, taxes and the state budget. In the event of a valid and favourable result, the law may only be amended by parliament or be the subject of a new referendum once a period of three years has passed.	Absolute majority + 50% participation	Binding
Slovakia	Abrogative	350,000 (≈8 % of the registrants in 2016)	Constitutionality review by the Constitutional Court if the President so requests. Not allowed in areas relating to fundamental rights and freedoms, taxes and the state budget. In the event of a valid and favourable result, the law may only be amended by parliament or be the subject of a new referendum once a period of three years has passed.	Absolute majority + 50% participation	Binding
Slovakia	Constitutional	350,000 (≈8 % of the registrants in 2016)	Constitutionality review by the Constitutional Court if the President so requests. Not allowed in areas relating to fundamental rights and freedoms, taxes and the state budget. In the event of a valid and favourable result, the law may only be amended by parliament or be the subject of a new referendum once a period of three years has passed.	Absolute majority + 50% participation	Binding
Slovenia	Abrogative	2,500 then 40,000 in one month (≈2,3 % of the registrants in 2017)	Not authorized against laws relating to the integrity of the territory of the Republic of Macedonia, fundamental human rights and freedoms, budget, taxes, financial obligations of the State, declarations of establishment and termination of the state of emergency, declarations of war and peace, as well as amnesty laws	Absolute majority + 20% of the registrants in favour	Binding
Switzerland	Abrogative	50,000 in one hundred days (≈ 0,9% of the registrants in 2018)	Applies to the introduction and revision of laws. The 100-day period runs from the date of its publication in the Federal Gazette. Can also be triggered by eight cantons of the twenty-six of the country.	Absolute majority	Binding
Switzerland	Constitutional	100,000 in eighteen months (≈ 1,8% of the registrants in 2018)	The proposal may be drafted in such a way as to be ready for adoption, or made in general terms, in which case the petitioners leave it to Parliament to draft.	Absolute majority if in general terms Majority of voters and cantons if proposal drafted	Binding
Taiwan	Legislative	0.01% then 1,5% of the registrants in six months	Must be validated by the Central Election Commission (CEC). Proposals to amend the Constitution and the name, national anthem, flag and borders of the country are excluded. While the electoral law exceptionally lowers the right to vote from 20 to 18 years of age in these referendums, they are also explicitly prohibited from changing the legal age of voting rights	Absolute majority + 25% of the registrants in favour	Binding
Taiwan	Abrogative	0.01% then 1,5% of the registrants in six months	Must be validated by the Central Election Commission (CEC). Proposals to amend the Constitution and the name, national anthem, flag and borders of the country are excluded. While the electoral law exceptionally lowers the right to vote from 20 to 18 years of age in these referendums, they are also explicitly prohibited from changing the legal age of voting rights	Absolute majority + 25% of the registrants in favour	Binding
Uruguay	Abrogative	25% of the registrants	Not allowed against decisions concerning the state budget, as well as areas within the presidential prerogatives	Absolute majority + 25% of the registrants in favour	Binding
Uruguay	Constitutional	10% of the registrants	The parliament may propose a counter-proposal, which will be submitted to a vote at the same time as the popular proposal.	Absolute majority + 35% of the registrants in favour	Binding
Venezuela	Legislative	10% of the registrants	Consultative referendums. The following can also be organised at the level of municipalities and States of Venezuela	Absolute majority	Non Binding
Venezuela	Abrogative	"Law": 10% of the registrants, "Decree": 5%.	Not authorized against laws relating to the budget, those establishing or amending taxes, or relating to credit, amnesty, human rights and international treaties. May only be organised once on the same subject for each five-year term of office of the meeting.	Absolute majority + 40% participation	Binding
Venezuela	Revocatory	20% of the registrants	Against the president or any other elected official. May only be convened once during his term of office, once the first half of his term has expired.	A higher number of votes for dismissal than the one obtained by the President at the time of his election + 25% of participation	Binding
Venezuela	Ratification of a treaty	15% of the registrants	Suspends ratification of the treaty in the meantime.	Absolute majority	Binding
Venezuela	Constitutional	15% of the registrants	The draft constitutional amendment may be submitted in its entirety to a referendum, or be the subject of separate questions if the President, one third of the parliament or 5% of the voters so request. May only be organised once per five-year term of office of the meeting.	Absolute majority	Binding
Venezuela	Constituent	15% of the registrants	Convene a constituent assembly. The new constitution prepared by the constituent assembly will in turn have to be put to a referendum.	Absolute majority	Binding

== See also ==
- History of direct democracy in the United States
- Referendums related to the European Union

=== Specific referendums ===
- Arizona Proposition 204, 2006
- Australian referendum, 1967 (Aboriginals)
- Belfast Agreement (1998)
- 2004 Bolivian gas referendum
- Carinthian Plebiscite (1920)
- 2004 Cypriot Annan Plan referendum
- Edinburgh congestion charge (2005)
- 2005 Kenyan constitutional referendum
- 1992 Montenegrin independence referendum
- 2006 Montenegrin independence referendum
- 1919 Norwegian prohibition referendum
- 1926 Norwegian continued prohibition referendum
- 1972 Norwegian European Communities membership referendum
- 1994 Norwegian European Union membership referendum
- 2006 Panama Canal expansion referendum
- Puerto Rico status referendums (1967, 1993, 1998)
- Republic of China referendums
- 2006 Serbian constitutional referendum
- 1992 South African referendum
- List of Swiss federal referendums
- 2006 Tokelauan self-determination referendum
- 2004 Venezuelan recall referendum
- Referendums in Canada
  - 1957 Alberta liquor plebiscite
  - British Columbia
    - 2002 British Columbia aboriginal treaty referendum
    - 2005 British Columbia electoral reform referendum
    - 2009 British Columbia electoral reform referendum
  - Charlottetown Accord
  - List of Northwest Territories plebiscites
  - 1948 Newfoundland referendums
  - 1982 Northwest Territories division plebiscite
  - 1995 Nunavut capital plebiscite
  - Ontario
    - 1894 Ontario prohibition plebiscite
    - 1902 Ontario prohibition referendum
    - 1919 Ontario prohibition referendum
    - 1921 Ontario prohibition referendum
    - 1924 Ontario prohibition referendum
    - 2007 Ontario electoral reform referendum
  - 2005 Prince Edward Island electoral reform referendum
  - Quebec
    - 1980 Quebec referendum
    - 1995 Quebec referendum
  - 2007 Saint John, New Brunswick ward plebiscite
- Referendums in the United Kingdom
  - 1975 United Kingdom European Communities membership referendum
  - United Kingdom European Constitution referendum (proposed)
  - 2011 United Kingdom Alternative Vote referendum
  - 2016 United Kingdom European Union membership referendum
  - 2004 Northern England devolution referendums
  - 1998 Northern Ireland Belfast Agreement referendum
  - 1973 Northern Ireland sovereignty referendum
  - 1979 Scottish devolution referendum
  - 1997 Scottish devolution referendum
  - 1979 Welsh devolution referendum
  - 1997 Welsh devolution referendum
  - 2011 Welsh devolution referendum
  - Edinburgh congestion charge
  - 1998 Greater London Authority referendum
- Referendums related to European Union accession:
  - 1972 Danish European Communities membership referendum
  - 1972 Norwegian European Communities membership referendum
  - 1994 Norwegian European Union membership referendum
  - 1994 Swedish European Union membership referendum (non-binding)
  - 2003 Polish European Union membership referendum
