= Referendums in Poland =

There have been several referendums in the history of Poland.

== Second Polish Republic (1918-1939) ==
There were no country-wide referendums, as this was neither mentioned in the March Constitution nor as a procedure. But there were two local referendums on border issues between Poland and Weimar Republic:

- 11 July 1920 – Referendum on Warmia, Mazury and Powiśle
- 20 March 1921 – Referendum on Upper Silesia

== Polish People's Republic (1946-1989) ==
There were two referendums in the People's Republic of Poland:

- 30 June 1946 – People's referendum (also known as the 3xTAK, 3 times YES referendum)
- 29 November 1987 – Referendum on political and economic reforms

== Third Polish Republic (1989-) ==
There have been six referendums in post-Communist Poland with only two binding:

- 18 February 1996:
  - Referendum on enfranchisement of citizens
  - Referendum with four questions on privatised assets
- 25 May 1997 – Constitutional referendum
- 7–8 June 2003 – Referendum on joining the EU
- 6 September 2015 – Referendum with three questions regarding Sejm representation, political party funding, and tax law dispute resolution: introducing single-member constituencies for Sejm elections, maintaining state financing of political parties, and introducing a presumption in favor of the taxpayer in disputes over tax law.
- 15 October 2023 – A referendum alongside nationwide elections to the Senate and Sejm. Four questions have been announced by members of the government from 11–14 August. Voters were asked whether they approve of privatisation of state-owned enterprises, increase in the retirement age, admission of immigrants under the EU relocation mechanism and removal of the barrier on Poland’s border with Belarus. The referendum was answered by around 40% of eligible Polish voters, making it not binding.

A referendum on the proposed EU Constitution was planned in 2005, but was abandoned after the rejection of the Constitution by French voters.

== Turnout ==
Year	Referendum	Voter turnout	Result
1946	People's referendum	90.10%	Binding (Note: Although the referendum was binding, both the results and the voter turnout were falsified.)
1987	Political and economic reforms	67.32%	Non-binding (Note: The law required over half of eligible voters to respond "yes" for the referendum to be valid. This condition wasn't met—only 44.28% and 46.29% of registered voters responded "yes" to the two questions. Therefore, the result wasn't binding)
1996	Enfranchisement of citizens	32.44%	Non-binding
1996	Privatised assets	32.44%	Non-binding
1997	Constitutional	42.86%	Binding (Note: Voter turnout was below the 50% threshold required by the 1995 Referendum Act. However, on 15 July, the Supreme Court ruled that the 1992 'small' constitution, which lacked turnout requirements, took precedence over the Act, thereby allowing the results to be binding.)
2003	European Union membership	58.85%	Binding
2015	Sejm representation	7.80%	Non-binding
2023	Privatization, retirement age, barrier, migration	40.91%	Non-binding
