= Privatization in Poland =

Privatization in Poland includes:

- 1996 Polish referendums, a double referendum on enfranchisement and state property
- Balcerowicz Plan, method for rapidly transitioning from an economy based on state ownership and central planning, to a capitalist market economy
- 2023 Polish referendum, a referendum on privatisation of state-owned enterprises
