= 2019 Romanian referendum =

Consultative referendum in Romania

- 26 May 2019

Do you agree with the prohibition on amnesties and pardons for corruption offences?
Yes	85.91%
No	14.09%

Do you agree with the prohibition of the approval by the Government of emergency ordinances in the field of offences, punishments and judicial organisation and with the extension of the right to directly appeal against the ordinances to the Constitutional Court?
Yes	86.18%
No	13.82%

A consultative referendum took place in Romania on 26 May 2019, on the same day as the European Parliament elections, about whether to prohibit amnesties and pardons for corruption offences, as well as whether to prohibit the Government from passing emergency ordinances concerning the judiciary and to extend the right to appeal against them to the Constitutional Court. Both proposals were approved by wide margins.

== Background ==
President Klaus Iohannis signed the decree to hold the referendum on 25 April 2019, after the Parliament had recommended in favour of this referendum in a non-binding vote on 17 April. The first proposal for this referendum to be held was made in early 2017, in the wake of the controversial Ordinance 13 and subsequent protests against corruption in Romania, and President Iohannis announced his intention to hold a referendum on 23 January 2019. However, the procedure was suspended until 26 May 2019, when Iohannis decided to extend the issues to be voted on, requiring a new parliamentary procedure. On 4 April, Iohannis announced the issues of the referendum: prohibiting amnesties and pardons for corruption offences, as well as prohibiting the government from adopting emergency ordinances in the field of offences, punishments, and judicial organisation and giving other constitutional authorities the right to submit the ordinances to the Constitutional Court for further review.

Before the parliamentary vote, President Klaus Iohannis sent a letter to leaders of parliamentary parties in order to invite them to a consultation on the referendum, the Alliance of Liberals and Democrats (ALDE) being the only party to decline the invitation. Eugen Tomac, the leader of the People's Movement Party (PMP), proposed an additional question for the referendum on one out of three issues suggested by his party: abolishing special pensions, returning to a two-round system for local elections, and lowering the number of MPs to 300.

On 16 April 2019, the common judiciary committees of the two chambers of the Parliament approved the referendum, the Parliament did so the next day in a non-binding vote. PNL and USR accused the PSD of introducing multiple recommendations that had not been discussed in the judiciary committees. Even though the opposition requested the elimination of these recommendations, government MPs disagreed, thus the report was adopted with 259 votes in favour, 9 votes against and 1 abstention. It is shown, among others, in the report, that amnesties and pardons cannot be a citizens' initiative according to the Constitution, and that the President cannot trigger a legislative referendum according to a Constitutional Court ruling. However, the recommendations were eliminated following another parliamentary vote, that passed with 218 votes in favour, 11 votes against and 3 abstentions.

On 25 April, the spokesperson of the Romanian Presidency, Mădălina Dobrovolschi, announced that President Klaus Iohannis had signed the decree for the referendum and published the two questions to be voted on.

== Support and opposition ==
Position	Political parties	Political orientation	Ref
Yes	National Liberal Party (PNL)	Conservative liberalism	
Yes	Save Romania Union (USR)	Anti-corruption	
Yes	Freedom, Unity and Solidarity Party (PLUS)	Liberalism	
Yes	People's Movement Party (PMP)	Christian democracy	
Yes	Democratic Alliance of Hungarians in Romania (UDMR/RMDSZ)	Hungarian minority politics	
Yes	Democratic Forum of Germans in Romania (FDGR/DFDR)	German minority politics	
Boycott	Alliance of Liberals and Democrats (ALDE)	Liberalism	
Boycott	Christian Democratic National Peasants' Party (PNȚCD)	Christian democracy	
Boycott	Ecologist Party of Romania (PER)	Green liberalism	
Boycott	Romanian Socialist Party (PSR)	Socialism	
Neutral	Social Democratic Party (PSD)	Social democracy	

In an interview for Antena 3, the then leader of the Social Democratic Party (PSD), Liviu Dragnea, stated that even though his party agrees with the referendum, "there are many voices that say that the referendum is actually useless for the publicly expressed purpose" and that "it actually is a way for Klaus Iohannis to get involved in the electoral campaign so that he can help parties around him". A similar position was shown by the Alliance of Liberals and Democrats (ALDE), the former junior partner in the bygone PSD-ALDE coalition government between 2017 and 2019, that announced its stance in a message on Facebook.

== Results ==
In order for the results to be valid, voter turnout was required to be above 30%, and the number of valid votes above 25% of the registered voters. Both thresholds were passed, validating the results.

Question	Yes		No		Invalid/ blank	Total votes	Registered voters	Turnout	Result
Question	Votes	%	Votes	%	Invalid/ blank	Total votes	Registered voters	Turnout	Result
Prohibition of amnesties and pardons for corruption offences	6,459,383	85.91	1,059,678	14.09	403,530	7,922,591	18,277,511	43.35%	Approved
Emergency ordinances	6,477,865	86.18	1,038,916	13.82	407,088	7,923,869	18,278,290	43.35%	Approved
Source: First question, Second question
