= 2013 Austrian conscription referendum =

- 20 January 2013
- a) Are you in favor of the introduction of a professional army and a paid voluntary social year or b) Are you in favor of maintaining general conscription and community service?

Results
Choice	Votes	%
Professional army	1,315,278	40.32%
General conscription	1,947,116	59.68%
Valid votes	3,262,394	97.54%
Invalid or blank votes	82,226	2.46%
Total votes	3,344,620	100.00%
Registered voters/turnout	6,378,628	52.43%
- Results by district

A non-binding referendum on ending conscription was held in Austria on 20 January 2013. The proposal was supported by the Social Democratic Party and the Green Party and opposed by the Austrian People's Party and the FPÖ. Though constitutionally not obligated to act on, both parties in government stated that they would honour the results.

The motion to end conscription and introduce a professional army was rejected.

== Background ==
Austria is one of the few members of the European Union to still retain compulsory military service, with others in 2013 including Cyprus, Estonia, Finland and Greece. Service in the Austrian Armed Forces is mandatory for all Austrian males older than 18, with around 22,000 males annually being drafted into six months of service in 2012. Conscription in Austria however allows conscripts to opt-out of military service and instead choose civic and community service as an alternative. Conscripts in the armed forces support efforts during natural disasters.

== Positions ==
=== Parliamentary parties ===
==== Social Democratic Party (SPÖ) ====
Norbert Darabos, then current Ministry of Defence, supported the proposal saying that conscription was outdated in a modern world with counterterrorism and cybercrime, with the shift of the armed forces into a professional army as being necessary due to change in threats.

==== Austrian People's Party (ÖVP) ====
Johanna Mikl-Leitner, the Minister of the Interior, criticized the proposal, calling it a "2-billion-euro castle in the sky", due to the perceived cost of creating a professional army. The ÖVP viewed conscription as essential to protecting Austrian sovereignty, and in supporting natural disaster relief efforts and social security. It also saw that a professional army would decrease the armed force's quality and increase its cost. ÖVP would come to view the referendum as being more about social and health security in Austria then about conscription.

=== Other organizations ===
- Katholische Jungschar: the organization's chairperson Noemi Müller, expressed mix feelings towards the referendum, stating their opposition to conscription but their reluctance to end the compulsory civic service that came with conscription.

== Results ==
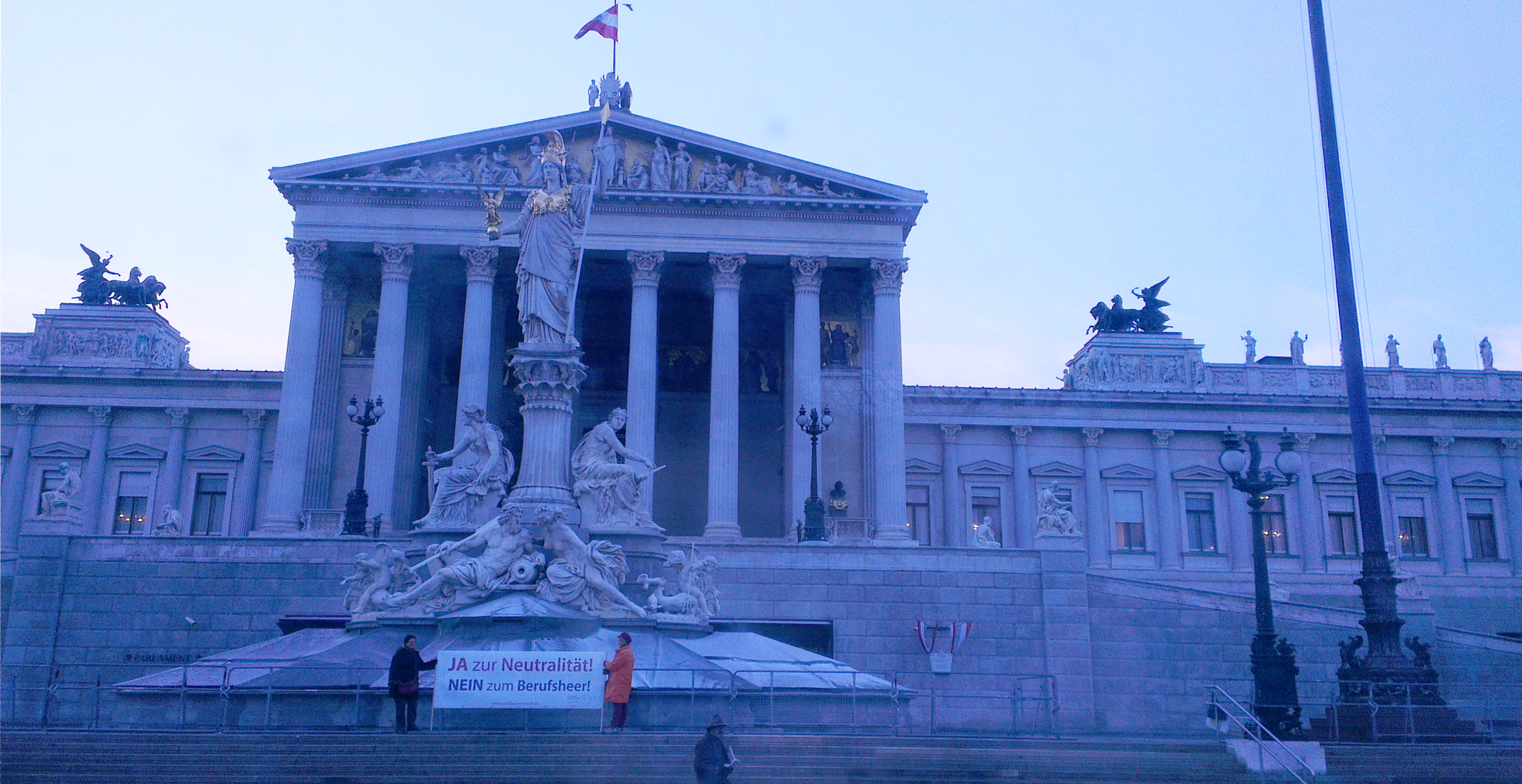
Anti-professional army protesters outside the Austrian Parliament Building on 11 December 2012. Translated, the banner reads; "Yes to neutrality! No to a professional army!"

Choice	Votes	%
For	1,315,278	40.32
Against	1,947,116	59.68
Total	3,262,394	100.00
Valid votes	3,262,394	97.54
Invalid/blank votes	82,226	2.46
Total votes	3,344,620	100.00
Registered voters/turnout	6,378,478	52.44
Source: Ministry of the Interior
