= 1987 Polish political and economic reforms referendum =

- 29 November 1987
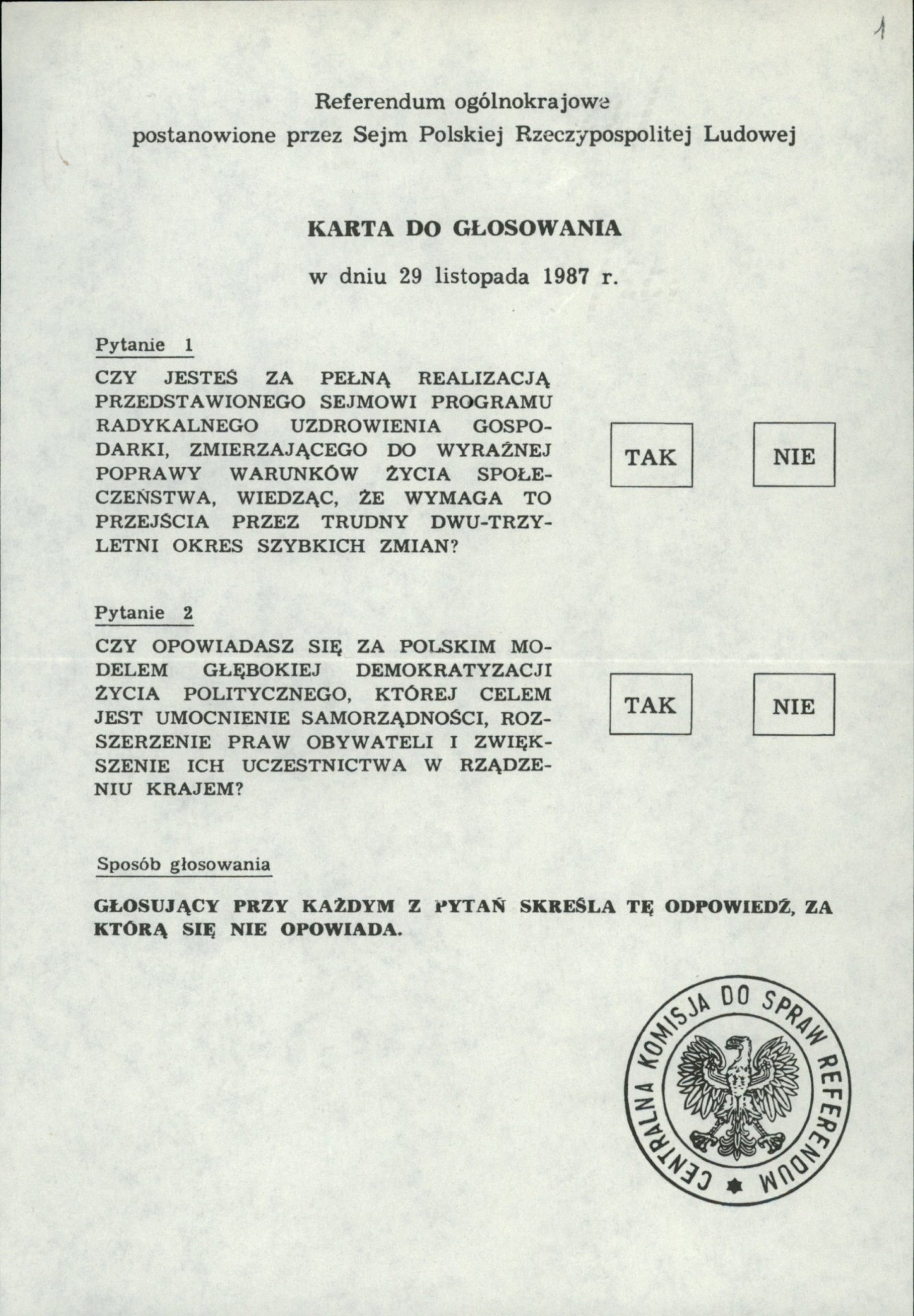
- Ballot paper for the referendum
- Outcome: The referendum result was not binding, as the required majority of over 50% of all eligible voters voting "yes" to each question was not achieved

1. Are you for full implementation of the program of radical curing of the economy presented to the Sejm aimed at clear improvement of the society’s living conditions, knowing that it will require going through a two-to-three-year period of quick changes?
Yes	66.04%
No	27.70%
Blank	6.27%

2. Are you for the Polish model of deep democratization of political life, the goal of which is to strengthen self-management, expand rights of citizens and increase their participation in governing the country?
Yes	69.03%
No	24.57%
Blank	6.40%

A referendum on political and economic reforms was held in Poland on 29 November 1987. The government's aim in holding the referendum was to obtain a mandate for difficult economic and political reforms. Around a third of eligible voters did not participate, defying the regime. Only 44% of Poland's 26 million eligible voters voted yes to the question on economic reform, and 46% voted yes to the second question on "democratisation" in Poland. Even though a majority of the votes cast supported the propositions, according to the rules of the referendum the majority of eligible voters had to vote yes in order for the referendum to pass. The resulting failure of the referendum was unprecedented, as it was the first time that Communist authorities in Eastern Europe had lost a vote.

== Questions ==
Voters were presented with two questions:

1. Are you for the support of radical economic reform?
2. Are you for a deep democratisation of the political life?

The first proposal would allow the government to carry out the "full government program for radical economic recovery," aimed at "improving living conditions," on the understanding that this would require a "difficult" two-to-three-year period of "rapid changes." The second would lead to the introduction a new "Polish model" for "democratising political life, aimed at strengthening self-government, extending the rights of citizens and increasing their participation" in running the country.

=== Ballot paper ===
Translation of the voting ballot paper:

Nationwide referendum decided by the Sejm of the Polish People's Republic

BALLOT PAPER

on November 29, 1987

Question 1

ARE YOU IN FAVOR OF THE FULL IMPLEMENTATION OF THE PARLIAMENTARY PROGRAM FOR THE RADICAL RECOVERY OF THE ECONOMY, AIMED AT A CLEAR IMPROVEMENT IN THE LIVING CONDITIONS OF SOCIETY, KNOWING THAT THIS REQUIRES GOING THROUGH A DIFFICULT TWO-TO-THREE-YEAR PERIOD OF RAPID CHANGE?

YES NO

Question 2

ARE YOU IN FAVOR OF THE POLISH MODEL OF DEEP DEMOCRATIZATION OF POLITICAL LIFE, THE AIM OF WHICH IS TO STRENGTHEN SELF-GOVERNMENT, EXPAND CITIZENS’ RIGHTS, AND INCREASE THEIR PARTICIPATION IN THE GOVERNANCE OF THE COUNTRY?

YES NO

Voting instructions

FOR EACH QUESTION, THE VOTER SHALL CROSS OUT THE ANSWER THEY DO NOT AGREE WITH.

Stamp: CENTRAL REFERENDUM COMMISSION (Państwowa Komisja Wyborcza)

== Results ==
Question	For		Against		Blank		Invalid	Total votes	Registered voters	Turnout	Quorum	Outcome
Question	Votes	%	Votes	%	Votes	%	Invalid	Total votes	Registered voters	Turnout	Quorum	Outcome
Economic reforms	11,601,975	66.04	4,866,207	27.70	1,100,781	6.27	69,520	17,638,483	26,201,169	67.32	13,100,585	Quorum not achieved
Political reforms	12,127,621	69.03	4,317,401	24.57	1,123,941	6.40	69,520	17,638,483	26,201,169	67.32	13,100,585	Quorum not achieved
Source: Central Committee for Referendum
