= 1805 Batavian Republic constitutional referendum =

1805 constitutional referendum in the Batavian Republic

A constitutional referendum was held in the Batavian Republic between 9 and 16 April 1805. Although a new constitution had been approved in an 1801 referendums, the French authorities put pressure on the Batavian State Council to pass a new constitution in which executive power was held by a single person, the Grand pensionary, a post initially filled by Rutger Jan Schimmelpenninck. The new constitution had 87 articles, which provided for a 19-seat Parliament with a three-year term which could pass or reject bills, but not change them.

Voting was not secret and took place by signing registers at meetings, meaning invalid votes were not possible. Voters had the option to vote for, against or abstain, with abstentions counted as a "for" vote. Of the 353,322 who signed the register, 33,093 voted yes, 136 against and 353,186 abstained. As a result, the constitution was approved by 99.96% of voters.

== Results ==
Choice		Votes	%
For	For	14,093	3.99
For	Abstention	339,093	95.97
For	Total	353,186	99.96
Against		136	0.04
Total		353,322	100.00
Valid votes		353,322	100.00
Invalid/blank votes		0	0.00
Total votes		353,322	100.00
Source: Direct Democracy
