= 2015 Polish referendum =

- 6 September 2015
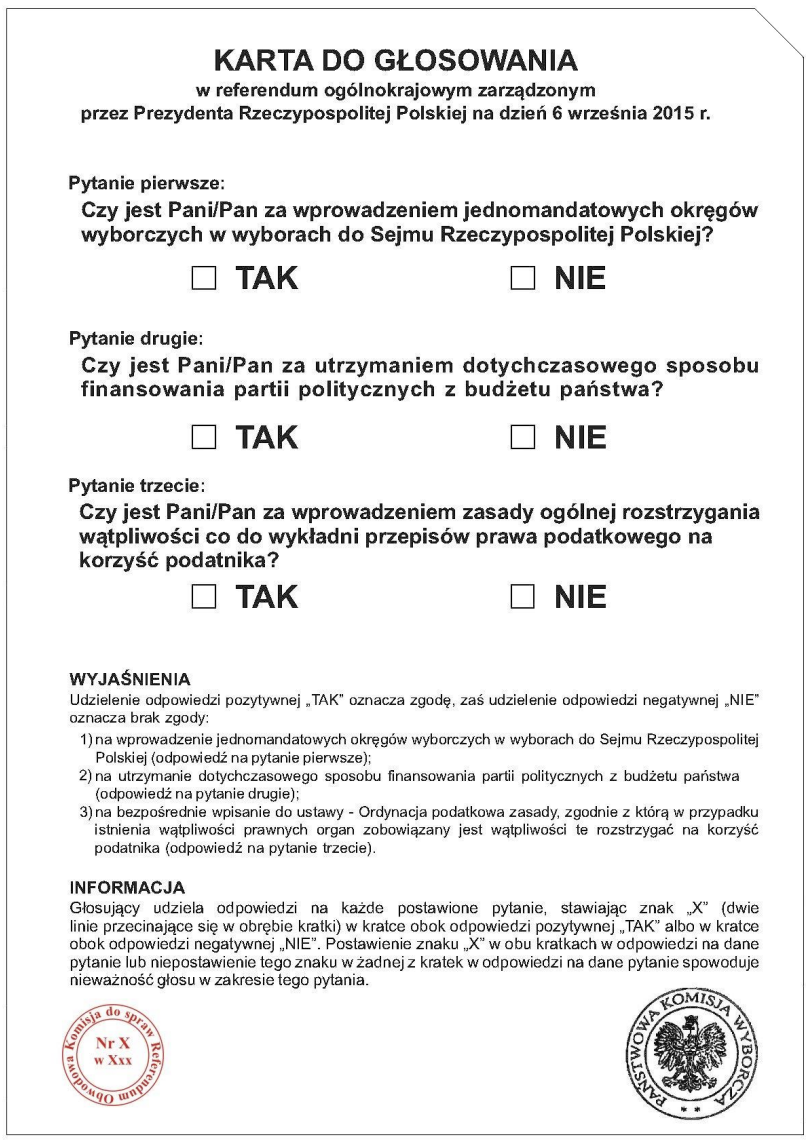
- Ballot paper
- Outcome: Referendum failed because the required voter turnout of 50% of eligible voters was not reached.

Are you in favour of introducing single-member constituencies in elections to the Sejm of the Republic of Poland?
Yes	78.75%
No	21.25%

Are you in favor of maintaining the current system of financing political parties from the state budget?
Yes	17.37%
No	82.63%

Are you in favour of introducing a general rule of resolving doubts regarding the interpretation of taxation law in favour of the tax-payer?
Yes	94.51%
No	5.49%

A three-part referendum was held in Poland on 6 September 2015. Voters were asked whether they approved of introducing single-member constituencies for Sejm elections, maintaining state financing of political parties and introducing a presumption in favour of the taxpayer in disputes over the tax law.

The voter turnout of 7.80 percent was well below the 50-percent threshold required for the referendum results to be legally binding, making it the lowest turnout for any referendum in Europe since 1945.

== Background ==
The referendums were ordered by President Bronisław Komorowski, who had promised to hold a referendum on the electoral system after the first round of the presidential elections, Although he had been leading in the polls, Komorowski received fewer votes (33.77%) than his main opponent Andrzej Duda (34.76%) in the first round, and then lost to Andrzej Duda in II round 48.5% to 51.5%. However third-placed candidate Paweł Kukiz received 20.8% of the vote, campaigning on introducing single-member constituencies for Sejm elections. A day after the May elections, Komorowski made an instantaneous decision to hold the referendum. Justifying his initiative, he explained that he saw high support for Kukiz as a signal that voters wanted changes.

== Referendum ==
On May 21, 57 senators present voted in favor of holding the referendum. However, 43 senators did not participate in the vote, the largest group among them being representatives of the Law and Justice party (PiS).

The Law and Justice party, followed later by KORWiN, as well as Zjednoczona Lewica called for the inclusion of additional questions in the referendum.

On August 21, President Andrzej Duda submitted to the Senate a draft decree scheduling an additional referendum for October 25 (the date of parliamentary elections). This referendum was to cover issues including the retirement age, the operation of state forests, and the compulsory schooling of six-year-olds. Polish Senate (incl. PO and PSL senators) rejected that proporsal.

A total of 133 entities were registered as eligible to conduct campaign activities, including 94 associations, 34 foundations, and 5 political parties. Additionally, 24 organizations were classified as ineligible.

Total cost of the referendum was 71,575,097 PLN (€16,8 M.).

== Questions ==
The referendum asked voters the following three yes-or-no questions:

1. Are you in favour of introducing single-member constituencies in elections to the Sejm of the Republic of Poland?
2. Are you in favor of maintaining the current system of financing political parties from the state budget?
3. Are you in favour of introducing a general rule of resolving doubts regarding the interpretation of taxation law in favour of the tax-payer?

=== Ballot paper ===
The ballot paper read:

EXPLANATIONS

Providing a positive answer "YES" indicates consent, while providing a negative answer "NO" indicates lack of consent:

1. for the introduction of single-member electoral districts in elections to the Sejm of the Republic of Poland (response to the first question);
2. for maintaining the current method of financing political parties from the state budget (response to the second question);
3. for the direct inclusion in the Tax Ordinance Act of a principle stating that in case of legal doubt, authorities are obliged to resolve such doubts in favor of the taxpayer (response to the third question).

INFORMATION

The voter answers each question by marking an "X" (two intersecting lines within the box) in the box next to the positive answer "YES" or in the box next to the negative answer "NO". Marking an "X" in both boxes for a given question or failing to mark either box makes the vote on that question invalid.

== Opinion polls ==
=== Stance on referendum questions (Note: All results are shown as percentages, except for the sample size.) ===
Date(s) conducted	Polling firm/Link	Sample size	Question no. 1			Question no. 2			Question no. 3			Turnout
Date(s) conducted	Polling firm/Link	Sample size	YES	NO	Don't know	YES	NO	Don't know	YES	NO	Don't know	Turnout
24 Aug	Millward Brown / "Fakty" TVN	1,003	62	28	9	19	75	6	90	4	4	55%
17–24 Aug	CBOS	1,040	41	22	19	14	73	7	76	4	11	52%
1–8 Jul	CBOS	1,044	45	16	25	13	75	9	81	4	11	62%
11–17 Jun	CBOS	1,011	54	18	16	15	75	6	82	5	8	60%
8–9 Jun	TNS Polska / TVP	1,000	60	20	20	19	73	8	90	4	6	76%
22–23 May	IBRiS / Rzeczpospolita	–	61	20	19	15	74	11	88	3	9	51%

=== Knowledge about the referendum ===
BY DECISION OF PRESIDENT BRONISŁAW KOMOROWSKI, WITH THE CONSENT OF THE SENATE, A NATIONWIDE REFERENDUM WILL BE HELD ON SEPTEMBER 6 OF THIS YEAR. DO YOU KNOW EXACTLY WHAT THIS REFERENDUM WILL BE ABOUT?
Date(s) conducted	Polling firm/Link	Sample size	Definitely yes	Rather yes	Rather no	Definitely no	Hard to say / refusal to answer
17–24 Aug	CBOS	1,040	22	29	21	27	1
1–8 Jul	CBOS	1,044	20	29	19	31	1
11–17 Jun	CBOS	1,011	17	22	22	36	3

== Results ==
Due to the fact that voter turnout did not exceed half of those eligible to vote, in accordance with Article 125, paragraph 3 of the Constitution of the Republic of Poland, the result of the referendum was not binding.

In November 2015, the Supreme Court confirmed the validity of the referendum. However, the voting in one of the districts in Siemianowice Śląskie was invalidated due to mixing up the answers "yes" and "no" on the third question. Later, the National Electoral Commission (PKW) corrected the results.

Question	For		Against		Invalid/ blank	Total	Registered voters	Turnout	Outcome
Question	Votes	%	Votes	%	Invalid/ blank	Total	Registered voters	Turnout	Outcome
Single-member constituencies	1,829,995	78.75	493,935	21.25	59,111	2,383,041	30,565,826	7.80	Failed to meet quorum
Maintaining state financing of political parties	404,515	17.37	1,923,994	82.63	54,532	2,383,041	30,565,826	7.80	Failed to meet quorum
Tax law interpretation	2,194,689	94.51	127,395	5.49	60,957	2,383,041	30,565,826	7.80	Failed to meet quorum
Source: National Electoral Commission
