= 1996 Polish referendum =

- 18 February 1996
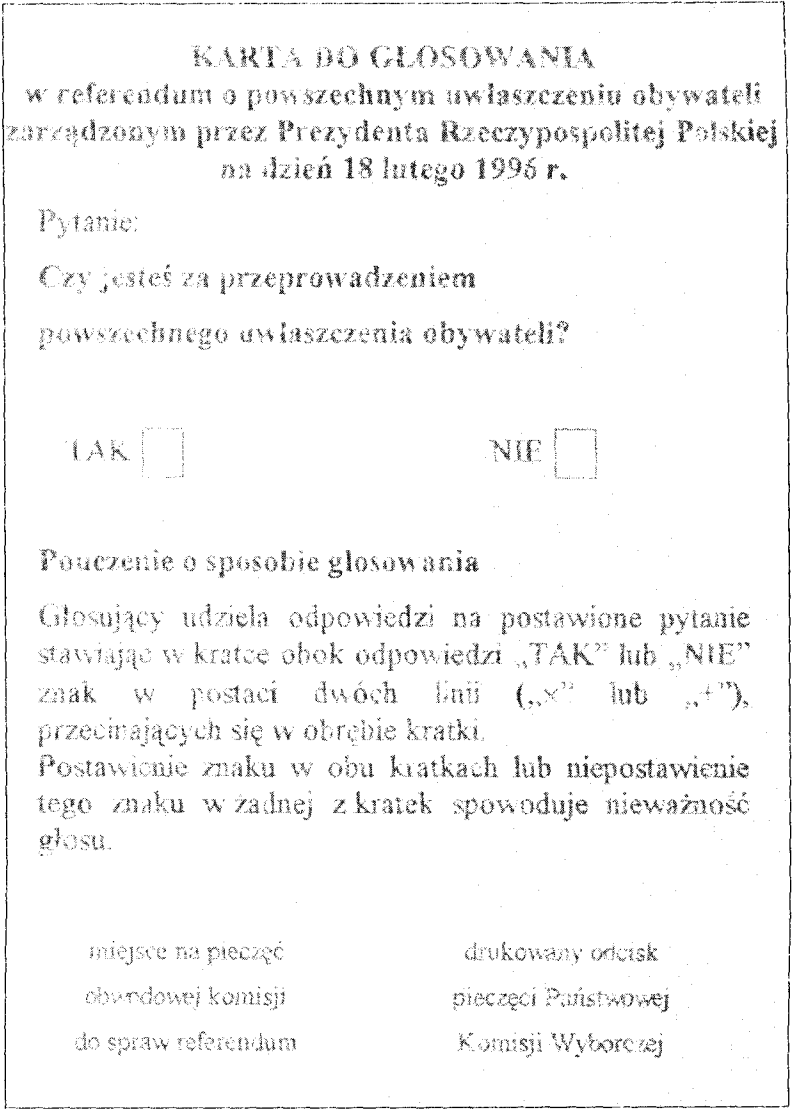
- Ballot used in the referendum
- Outcome: Referendums failed as voter turnout was below the 50% quorum required

1. Do you approve the enfranchisement of citizens?
Yes	96.15%
No	3.85%

1. Are you in favour of fulfilling the obligations towards pensioners and disability pensioners, as well as public sector employees, arising from Constitutional Tribunal rulings, using funds from the privatised state assets?
Yes	95.07%
No	4.93%

2. Are you in favour of allocating part of the privatised state assets to public pension funds?
Yes	95.99%
No	4.01%

3. Are you in favour of increasing the value of National Investment Fund share certificates by including more enterprises in this programme?
Yes	23.16%
No	76.84%

4. Are you in favour of including privatisation vouchers in the enfranchisement programme?
Yes	91.32%
No	8.68%

A double referendum was held in Poland on 18 February 1996. One question concerned enfranchisement, whilst the others concerned state property. The first proposition was ordered by the President, whilst the others were created on the basis of resolution made by Sejm. All except one were approved by over 90% of voters. However, voter turnout was just 32%, well below the 50% threshold required to make the results valid.

== Act about the referendums ==
The act about the referendum was passed on 25 June 1995 (Dz.U. 99, position 487 from 25.08.1995)

== Subject of the referendums ==
=== Enfranchisement question ===
On 29 November 1995 President of Poland Lech Wałęsa, after getting permission from Senate, mandated a referendum with the question:

- Do you approve the enfranchisement of citizens?

=== Privatisation questions ===
On 21 December 1995 the Sejm passed a referendums act, in which four question were to be placed on the ballot:

1. Are you in favour of fulfilling the obligations towards pensioners and disability pensioners, as well as public sector employees, arising from Constitutional Tribunal rulings, using funds from the privatised state assets?
2. Are you in favour of allocating part of the privatised state assets to public pension funds?
3. Are you in favour of increasing the value of National Investment Fund share certificates by including more enterprises in this programme?
4. Are you in favour of including privatisation vouchers in the enfranchisement programme?

== Results ==
Question	For		Against		Invalid/ blank	Total votes	Registered voters	Turnout	Outcome
Question	Votes	%	Votes	%	Invalid/ blank	Total votes	Registered voters	Turnout	Outcome
Enfranchisement of citizens	8,580,129	96.15	343,197	3.85	152,678	9,076,004	28,009,715	32.40	Turnout quorum not reached
Fulfilling obligations towards pensioners and public sector workers	8,439,458	95.07	437,466	4.93	208,221	9,085,145	28,009,715	32.44	Turnout quorum not reached
Allocating privatised state assets to public pension funds	8,512,931	95.99	355,363	4.01	216,851	9,085,145	28,009,715	32.44	Turnout quorum not reached
Including more enterprises in the National Investment Fund	1,985,567	23.16	6,588,559	76.84	511,019	9,085,145	28,009,715	32.44	Turnout quorum not reached
Including privatisation vouchers in the enfranchisement programme	8,022,353	91.32	762,905	8.68	299,887	9,085,145	28,009,715	32.44	Turnout quorum not reached
Source: Source: Dz. U. 1996 r. nr 22, poz. 101

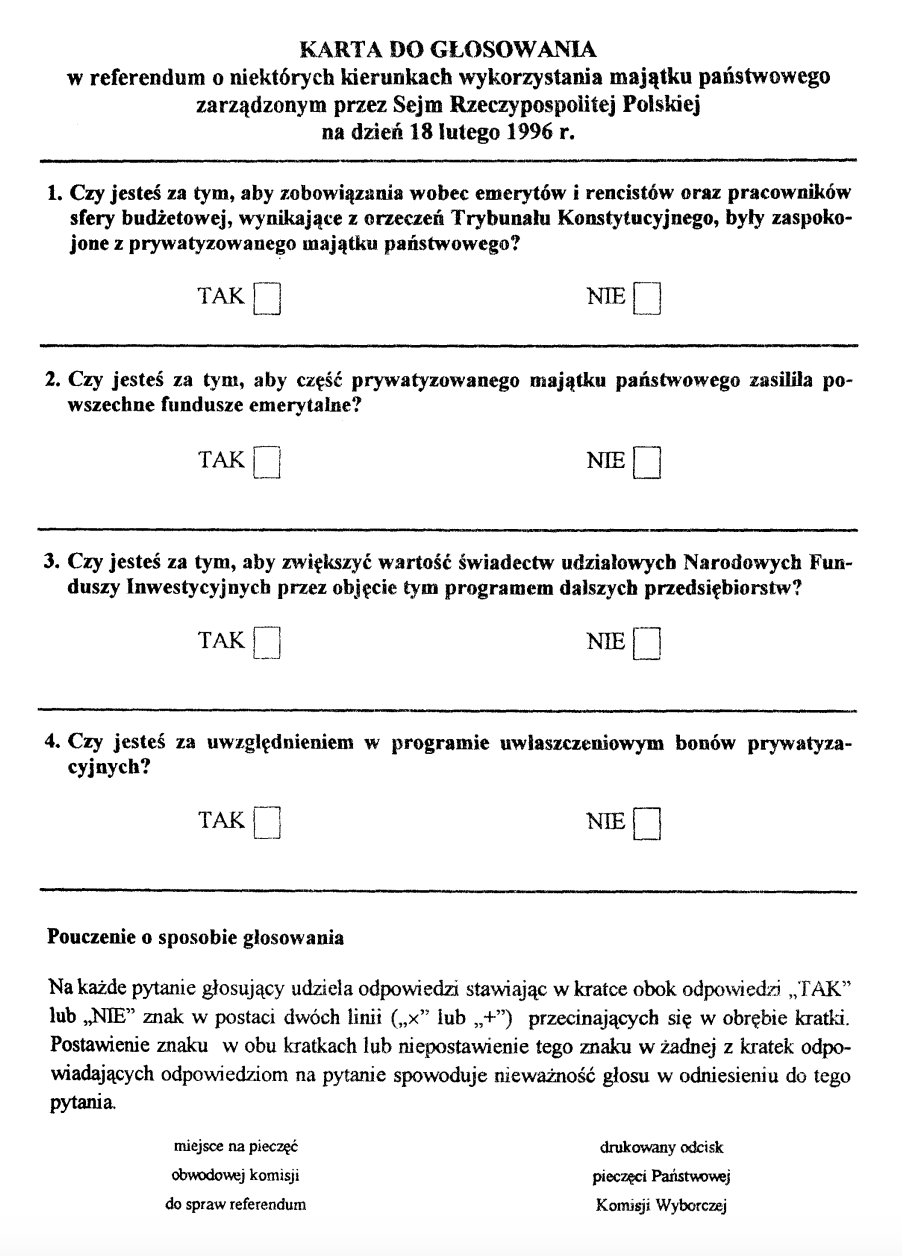
Ballot used for questions about privatisation. (Without the PKW and district commission for the referendum stamps)
