= Zaścianki =

Zaścianki may refer to the following places:

- Zaścianki, Lublin Voivodeship (east Poland)
- Zaścianki, Podlaskie Voivodeship (Gmina Supraśl, Białystok County) (north-east Poland)
- Zaścianki (Bogusze), Gmina Sokółka, Sokółka County, Podlaskie Voivodeship (north-east Poland)
- Zaścianki (Kurowszczyzna), Gmina Sokółka, Sokółka County, Podlaskie Voivodeship (north-east Poland)
- Zaścianki, Warmian-Masurian Voivodeship (north Poland)
