= Szor =

Szor is a surname. It may be a Polish surname. Notable people with the surname include:

- Daniel Szor, American-British entrepreneur and distiller
- Rachel Szor, Israeli filmographer

== See also ==
- Szőr, a surname
- Stary Szor, village in Podlaskie Voivodeship, Poland
- Shor (disambiguation)
