= Zaścianki (Bogusze) =

- Village
- Location within Poland
- Coordinates: 53°25′01″N 23°26′01″E
- Country: Poland
- Voivodeship: Podlaskie
- County: Sokółka
- Gmina: Sokółka

Zaścianki [zaɕˈt͡ɕaŋki] is a village in the administrative district of Gmina Sokółka, within Sokółka County, in Podlaskie Voivodeship, north-eastern Poland. It is located near the border with Belarus.

It is also referred to as Zaścianki koło Bogusz ("Zaścianki near Bogusze") to differentiate it from another village in the gmina, Zaścianki koło Kurowszczyzny ("Zaścianki near Kurowszczyzna")
