= Gmina Sokółka =

Gmina Sokółka Sokółka Commune
- Gmina
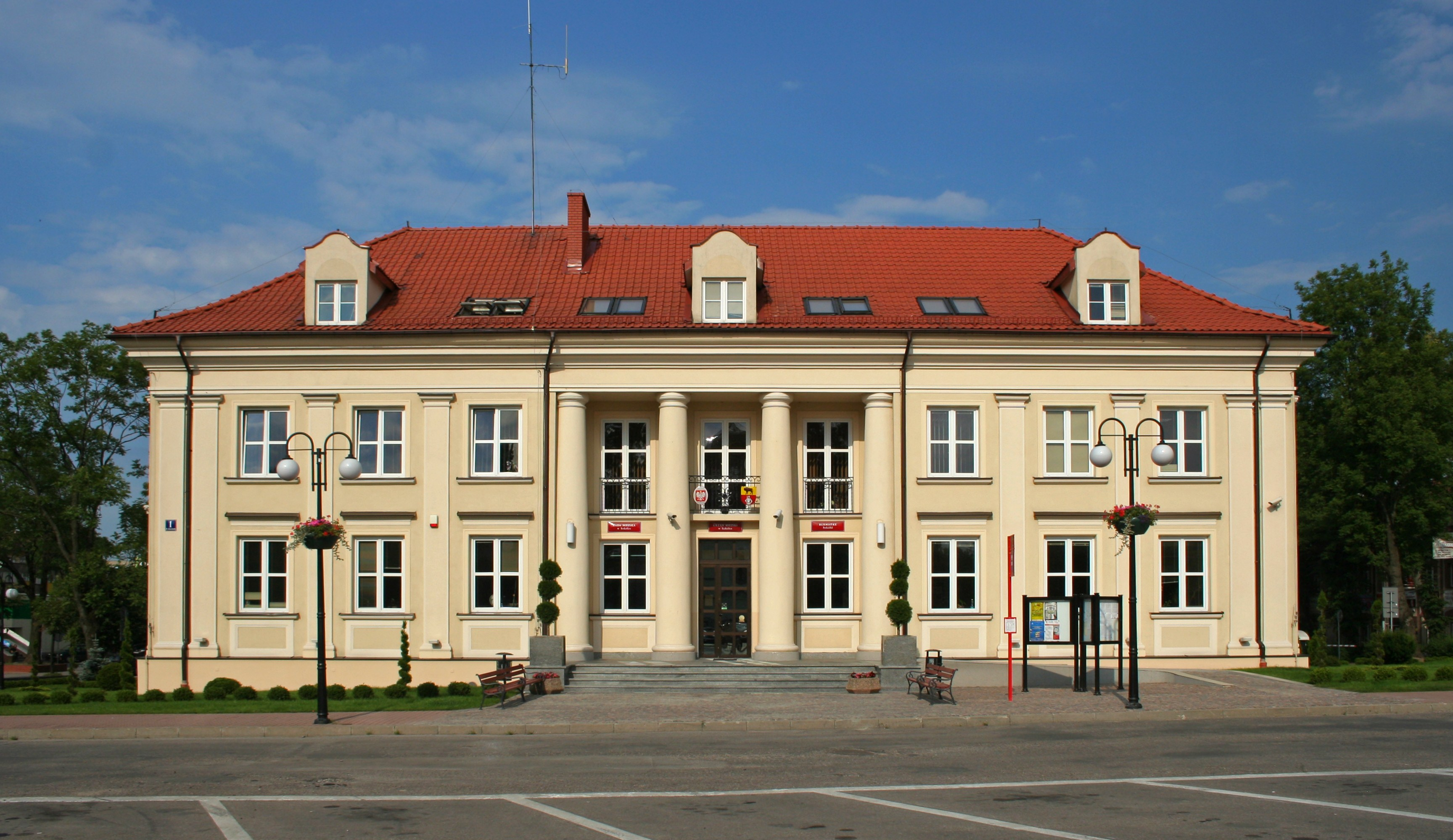
- Town Hall in Sokółka, seat of the gmina office

- Coat of arms

- Gmina Sokółka within the Sokółka County
- Coordinates (Sokółka): 53°24′N 23°30′E
- Country: Poland
- Voivodeship: Podlaskie
- County: Sokółka
- Seat: Sokółka

Area
  - Total: 313.62 km^{2} (121.09 sq mi)

Population (2006)
  - Total: 26,406
  - Density: 84.197/km^{2} (218.07/sq mi)
  - Urban: 18,888
  - Rural: 7,518
- Time zone: UTC+1 (CET)
  - Summer (DST): UTC+2 (CEST)
- Vehicle registration: BSK
- Website: https://www.sokolka.pl

Gmina Sokółka is an urban-rural gmina (administrative district) in Sokółka County, Podlaskie Voivodeship, in north-eastern Poland, on the border with Belarus. Its seat is the town of Sokółka, which lies approximately 39 kilometres (24 mi) north-east of the regional capital Białystok.

The gmina covers an area of 313.62 square kilometres (121.1 sq mi), and as of 2006 its total population is 26,406 (out of which the population of Sokółka amounts to 18,888, and the population of the rural part of the gmina is 7,518).

The gmina contains part of the protected area called Knyszyń Forest Landscape Park.

== Villages ==
Apart from the town of Sokółka, Gmina Sokółka contains the villages and settlements of:

- Bachmatówka
- Bilwinki
- Bobrowniki
- Bogusze
- Boguszowski Wygon
- Bohoniki
- Dąbrówka
- Drahle
- Dworzysk
- Geniusze
- Gilbowszczyzna
- Gliniszcze Małe
- Gliniszcze Wielkie
- Gnidzin
- Halańskie Ogrodniki
- Hałe
- Igryły
- Jałówka
- Janowszczyzna
- Jelenia Góra
- Kantorówka
- Karcze
- Kraśniany
- Kundzicze
- Kundzin
- Kundzin Kościelny
- Kurowszczyzna
- Kuryły
- Lebiedzin
- Lipina
- Lipowa Góra
- Malawicze Dolne
- Malawicze Górne
- Maślanka
- Mićkowa Hać
- Miejskie Nowiny
- Nomiki
- Nowa Kamionka
- Nowa Moczalnia
- Nowa Rozedranka
- Nowinka
- Orłowicze
- Ostrówek
- Pawełki
- Pawłowszczyzna
- Planteczka
- Plebanowce
- Podjałówka
- Podjanowszczyzna
- Podkamionka
- Podkantorówka
- Pogibło
- Polanki
- Poniatowicze
- Puciłki
- Ściebielec
- Sierbowce
- Słojniki
- Smolanka
- Sokolany
- Stara Kamionka
- Stara Moczalnia
- Stara Rozedranka
- Stary Szor
- Starzynka
- Stodolne
- Straż
- Szyndziel
- Szyszki
- Tartak
- Tatarszczyzna
- Wierzchjedlina
- Wierzchłowce
- Wilcza Jama
- Wojnachy
- Woroniany
- Wroczyńszczyzna
- Wysokie Laski
- Zadworzany
- Zamczysk
- Zaścianki (Bogusze)
- Zaścianki (Kurowszczyzna)
- Zaśpicze
- Zawistowszczyzna
- Żuki

== Neighbouring gminas ==
Gmina Sokółka is bordered by the gminas of Czarna Białostocka, Janów, Kuźnica, Sidra, Supraśl and Szudziałowo. It also borders Belarus.
