= Nowa Kamionka =

Nowa Kamionka may refer to the following places:

- Nowa Kamionka, Augustów County in Podlaskie Voivodeship (north-east Poland)
- Nowa Kamionka, Sokółka County in Podlaskie Voivodeship (north-east Poland)
- Nowa Kamionka, Suwałki County in Podlaskie Voivodeship (north-east Poland)
