= Zaścianki (Kurowszczyzna) =

- Village
- Location within Poland
- Coordinates: 53°23′01″N 23°30′01″E
- Country: Poland
- Voivodeship: Podlaskie
- County: Sokółka
- Gmina: Sokółka

Zaścianki [zaɕˈt͡ɕaŋki] is a village in the administrative district of Gmina Sokółka, within Sokółka County, Podlaskie Voivodeship, in north-eastern Poland, close to the border with Belarus.

It is also known as Zaścianki koło Kurowszczyzny ("Zaścianki near Kurowszczyzna") to distinguish it from another village in the gmina, Zaścianki koło Bogusz ("Zaścianki near Bogusze")
