= Maślanka, Podlaskie Voivodeship =

Maślanka
- Village
- Location within Poland
- Coordinates: 53°22′33″N 23°26′24″E
- Country: Poland
- Voivodeship: Podlaskie
- County: Sokółka
- Gmina: Sokółka

Maślanka [maˈɕlaŋka] is a village in the administrative district of Gmina Sokółka, within Sokółka County, Podlaskie Voivodeship, in north-eastern Poland, close to the border with Belarus.
