= Puciłki =

- Village
- Location within Poland
- Coordinates: 53°26′N 23°37′E
- Country: Poland
- Voivodeship: Podlaskie
- County: Sokółka
- Gmina: Sokółka

Puciłki [puˈt͡ɕiu̯ki] (also known as Wieś Molawice) is a village in the administrative district of Gmina Sokółka, within Sokółka County, Podlaskie Voivodeship, in north-eastern Poland, close to the border with Belarus.
