= Geniusze =

- Village
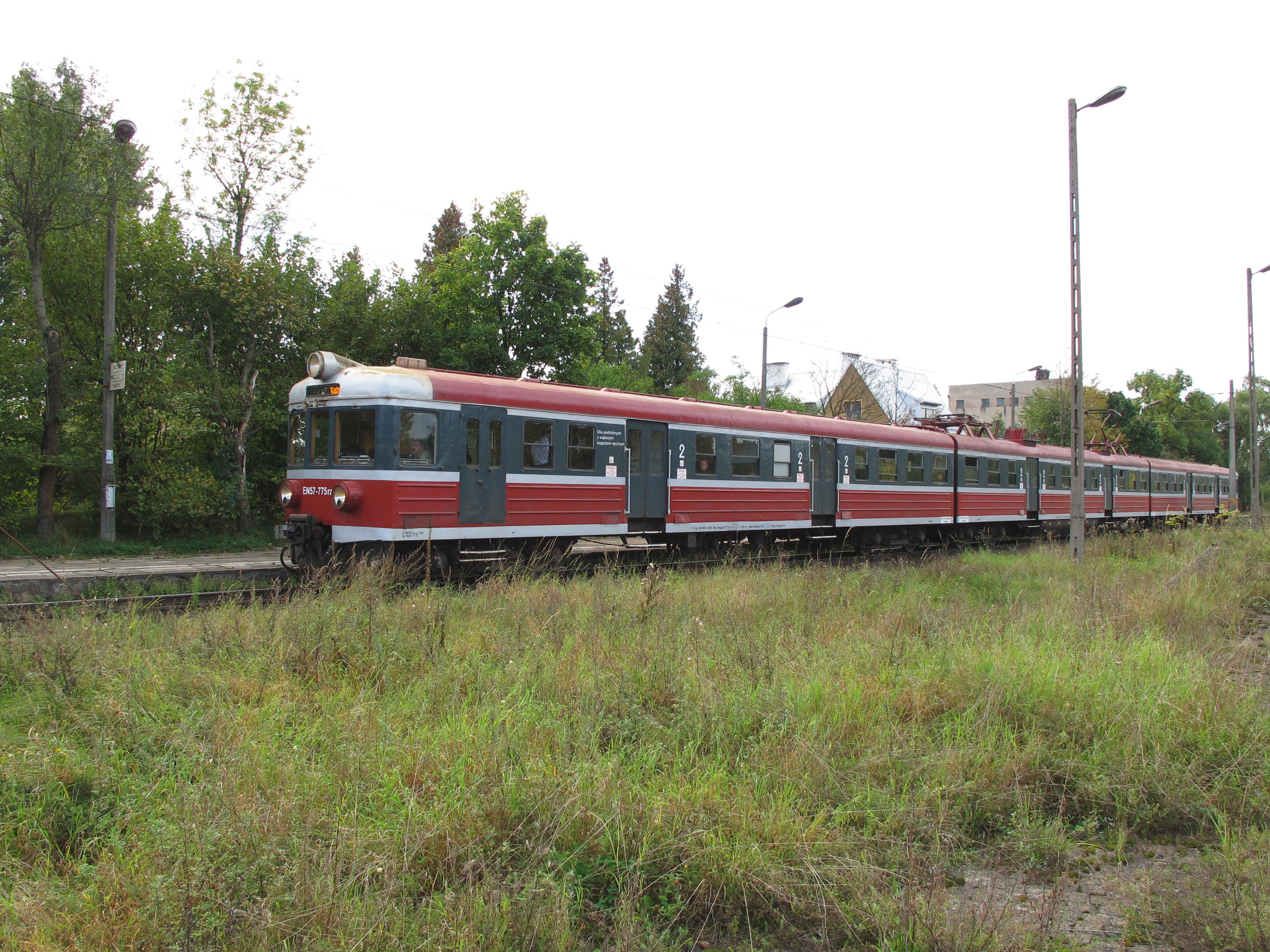
- Train station in Geniusze

- Location within Poland
- Coordinates: 53°22′22″N 23°25′28″E
- Country: Poland
- Voivodeship: Podlaskie
- County: Sokółka
- Gmina: Sokółka

Geniusze [ɡɛˈɲuʂɛ] is a village in the administrative district of Gmina Sokółka, within Sokółka County, Podlaskie Voivodeship, in north-eastern Poland, close to the border with Belarus.
