= Zamczysk, Sokółka County =

Zamczysk
- Village
- Location within Poland
- Coordinates: 53°28′05″N 23°34′08″E
- Country: Poland
- Voivodeship: Podlaskie
- County: Sokółka
- Gmina: Sokółka

Zamczysk [ˈzamt͡ʂɨsk] is a village in the administrative district of Gmina Sokółka, within Sokółka County, Podlaskie Voivodeship, in north-eastern Poland, close to the border with Belarus.
