= Zawistowszczyzna =

- Village
- Location within Poland
- Coordinates: 53°23′N 23°28′E
- Country: Poland
- Voivodeship: Podlaskie
- County: Sokółka
- Gmina: Sokółka
- Website: http://www.zawistowszczyzna.com/

Zawistowszczyzna [zavistɔfʂˈt͡ʂɨzna] is a village in the administrative district of Gmina Sokółka, within Sokółka County, Podlaskie Voivodeship, in north-eastern Poland, close to the border with Belarus.

Since March 2007, the sołtys (village chief) is Dr. Mohamed Ali Al-Hameri, a gynaecologist born in Yemen who came to Poland in 1983 to study medicine.
