= Malawicze Górne =

- Village
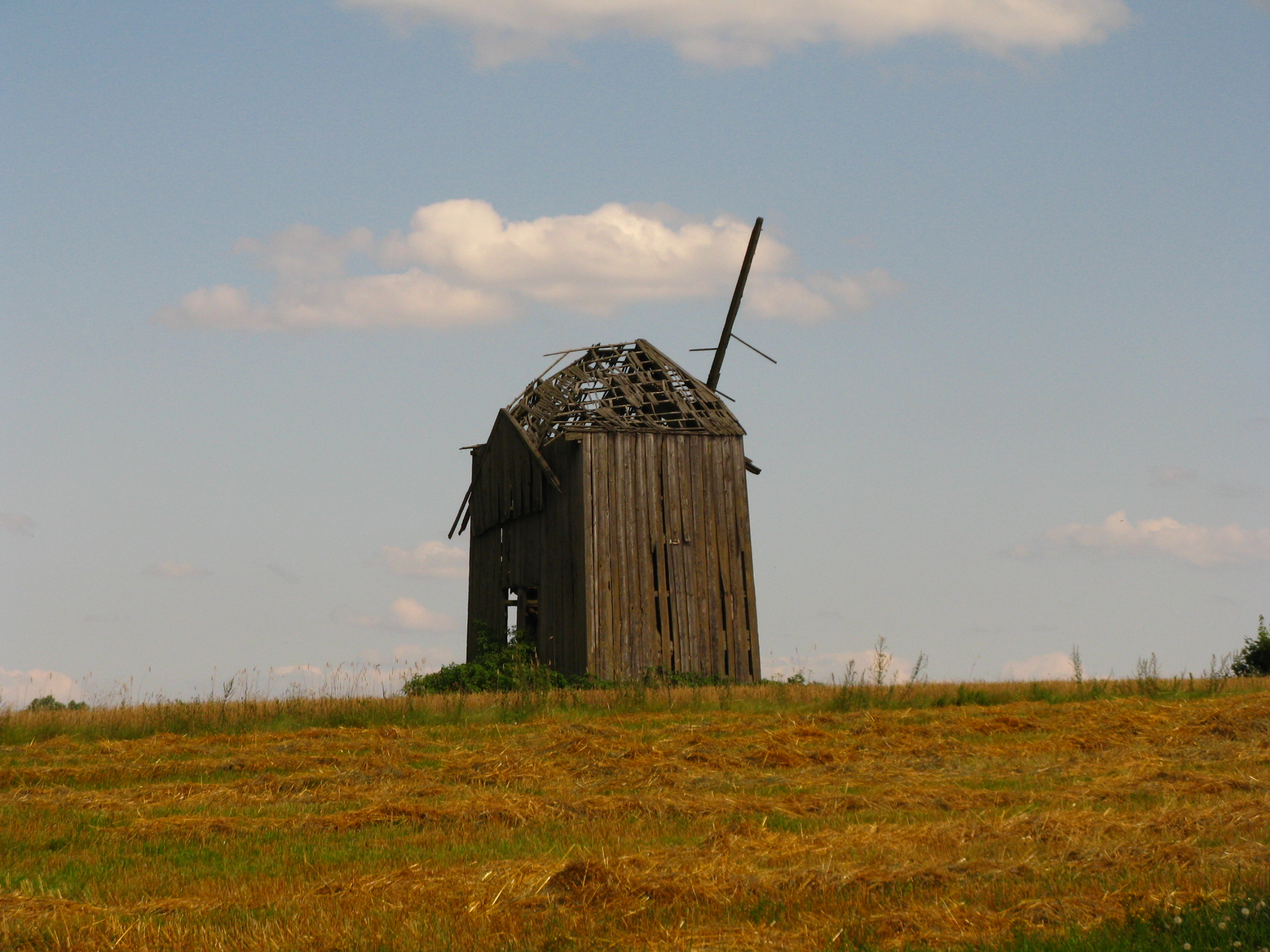

- Location within Poland
- Coordinates: 53°25′N 23°37′E
- Country: Poland
- Voivodeship: Podlaskie
- County: Sokółka
- Gmina: Sokółka
- Population: 70

Malawicze Górne [malaˈvit͡ʂɛ ˈɡurnɛ] is a village in the administrative district of Gmina Sokółka, within Sokółka County, Podlaskie Voivodeship, in north-eastern Poland, close to the border with Belarus. It lies approximately 8 km (5 mi) east of Sokółka and 45 km (28 mi) north-east of the regional capital Białystok.
