= Wierzchłowce =

- Village
- Location within Poland
- Coordinates: 53°23′25″N 23°23′25″E
- Country: Poland
- Voivodeship: Podlaskie
- County: Sokółka
- Gmina: Sokółka

Wierzchłowce [vjɛʂˈxwɔft͡sɛ] is a village in the administrative district of Gmina Sokółka, within Sokółka County, Podlaskie Voivodeship, in north-eastern Poland, close to the border with Belarus.
