= Szyndziel =

- Village
- Location within Poland
- Coordinates: 53°25′50″N 23°24′4″E
- Country: Poland
- Voivodeship: Podlaskie
- County: Sokółka
- Gmina: Sokółka
- Population: 110

Szyndziel [ˈʂɨnd͡ʑɛl] is a village in the administrative district of Gmina Sokółka, within Sokółka County, Podlaskie Voivodeship, in north-eastern Poland, close to the border with Belarus.
