= Starzynka, Podlaskie Voivodeship =

Starzynka
- Village
- Location within Poland
- Coordinates: 53°21′25″N 23°19′25″E
- Country: Poland
- Voivodeship: Podlaskie
- County: Sokółka
- Gmina: Sokółka

Starzynka [staˈʐɨŋka] is a village in the administrative district of Gmina Sokółka, within Sokółka County, Podlaskie Voivodeship, in north-eastern Poland, close to the border with Belarus.
