= Kundzin =

- Village
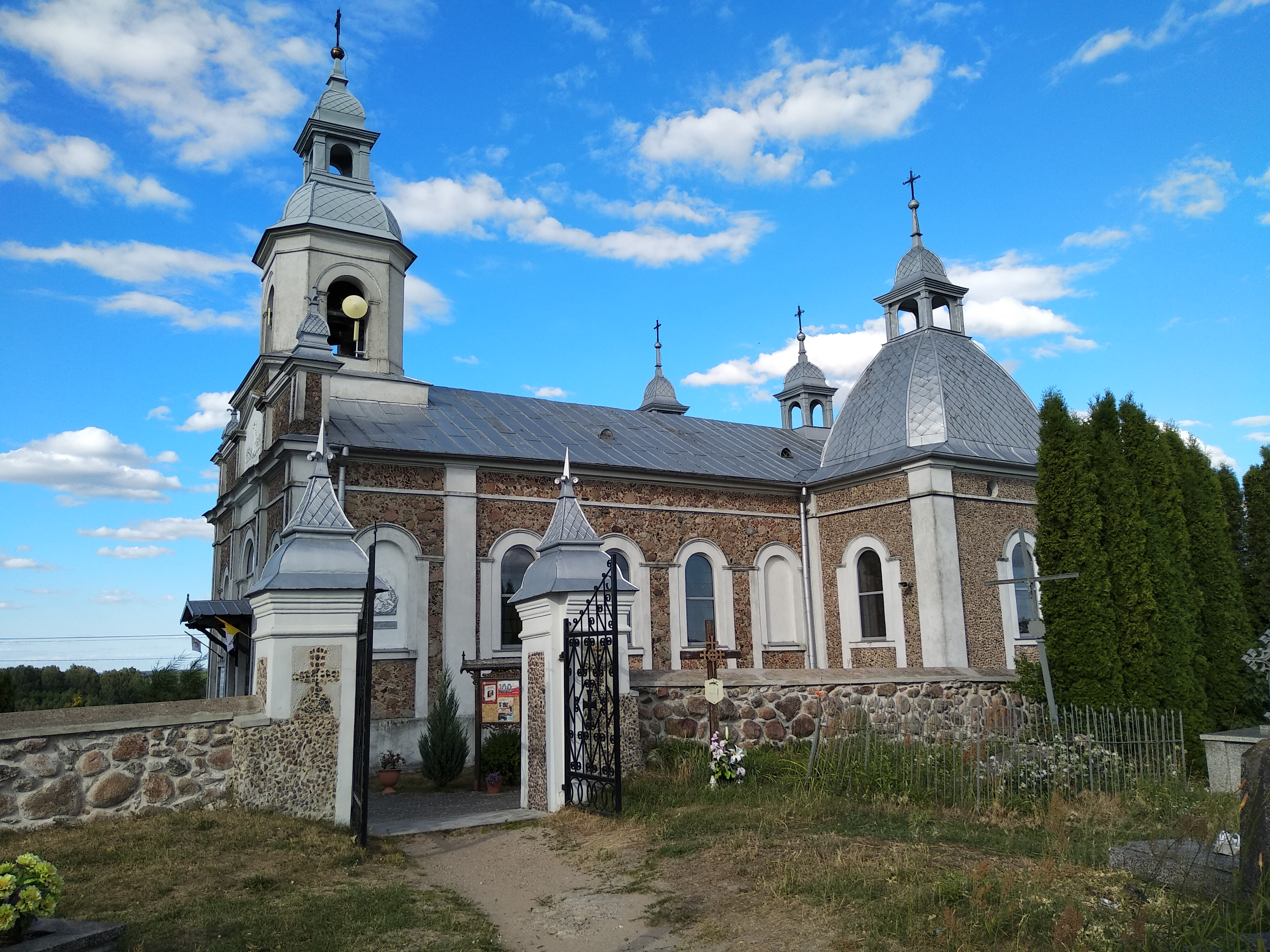
- Church in Kundzin

- Location within Poland
- Coordinates: 53°26′26″N 23°35′36″E
- Country: Poland
- Voivodeship: Podlaskie
- County: Sokółka
- Gmina: Sokółka

Kundzin [ˈkund͡ʑin] is a village in the administrative district of Gmina Sokółka, within Sokółka County, Podlaskie Voivodeship, in north-eastern Poland, close to the border with Belarus.
