= Kraśniany =

- Village
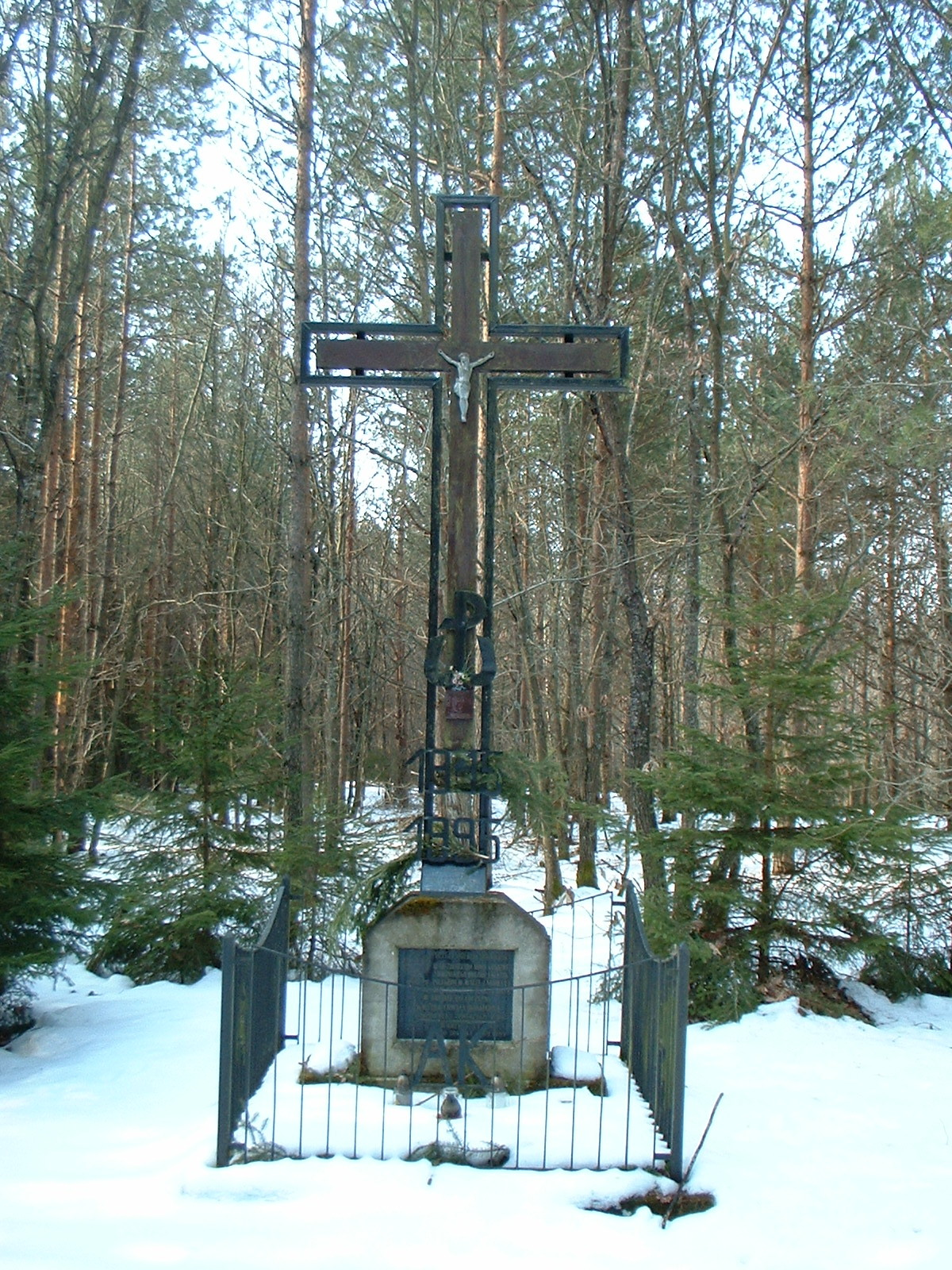
- Monument to the Home Army soldiers in Kraśniany

- Location within Poland
- Coordinates: 53°27′N 23°29′E
- Country: Poland
- Voivodeship: Podlaskie
- County: Sokółka
- Gmina: Sokółka

Kraśniany [kraɕˈɲanɨ] is a village in the administrative district of Gmina Sokółka, within Sokółka County, Podlaskie Voivodeship, in north-eastern Poland, close to the border with Belarus.
