= Halańskie Ogrodniki =

Village in Gmina Sokółka, Poland

- Village
- Location within Poland
- Coordinates: 53°23′29″N 23°21′10″E
- Country: Poland
- Voivodeship: Podlaskie
- County: Sokółka
- Gmina: Sokółka

Halańskie Ogrodniki [xaˈlaɲskʲɛ ɔɡrɔdˈniki] is a village in the administrative district of Gmina Sokółka, within Sokółka County, Podlaskie Voivodeship, in north-eastern Poland, close to the border with Belarus.
