= Malawicze Dolne =

- Village
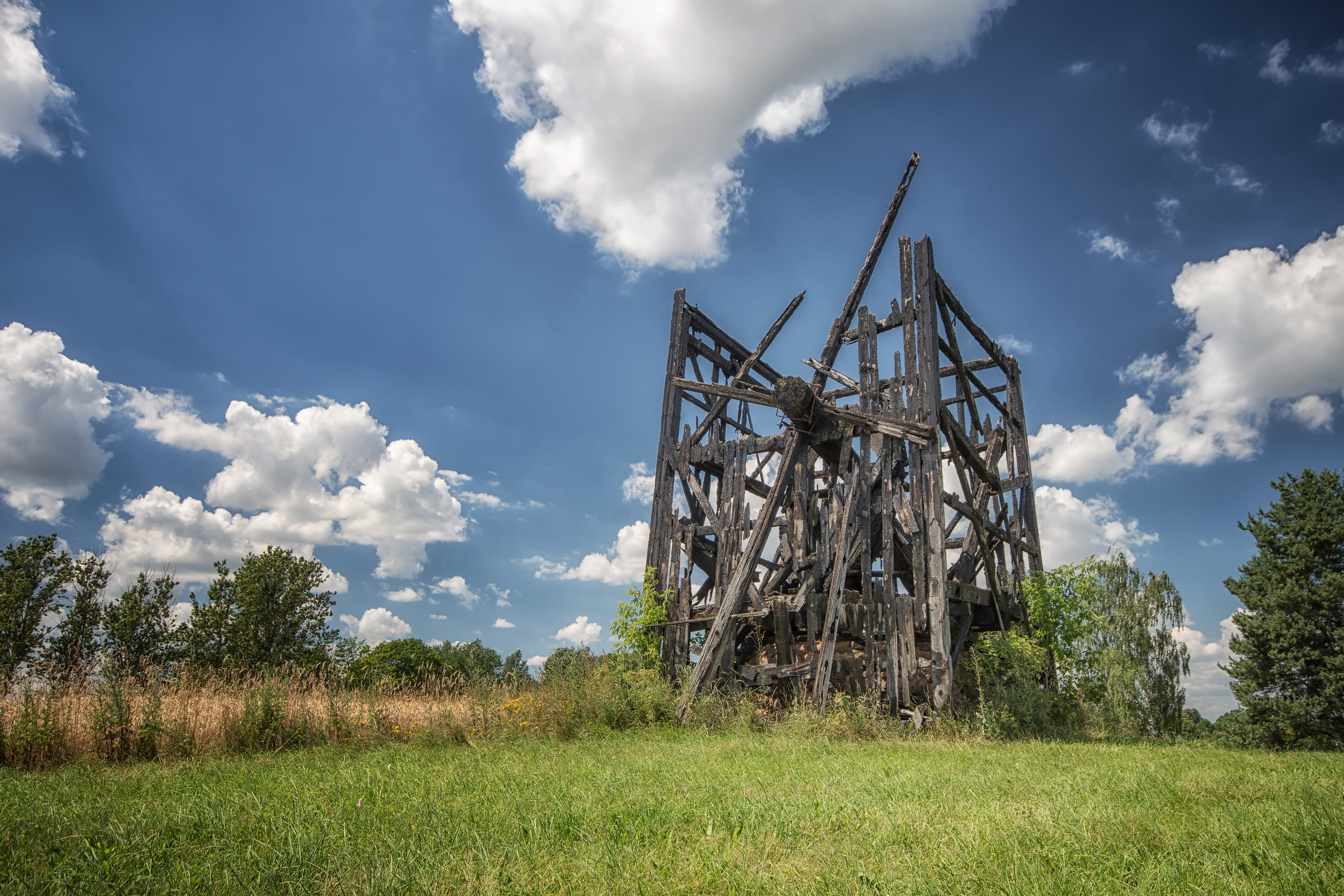
- Post mill in Malawicze Dolne

- Location within Poland
- Coordinates: 53°25′N 23°38′E
- Country: Poland
- Voivodeship: Podlaskie
- County: Sokółka
- Gmina: Sokółka

Malawicze Dolne [malaˈvit͡ʂɛ ˈdɔlnɛ] is a village in the administrative district of Gmina Sokółka, within Sokółka County, Podlaskie Voivodeship, in north-eastern Poland, close to the border with Belarus.
