= Mićkowa Hać =

- Village
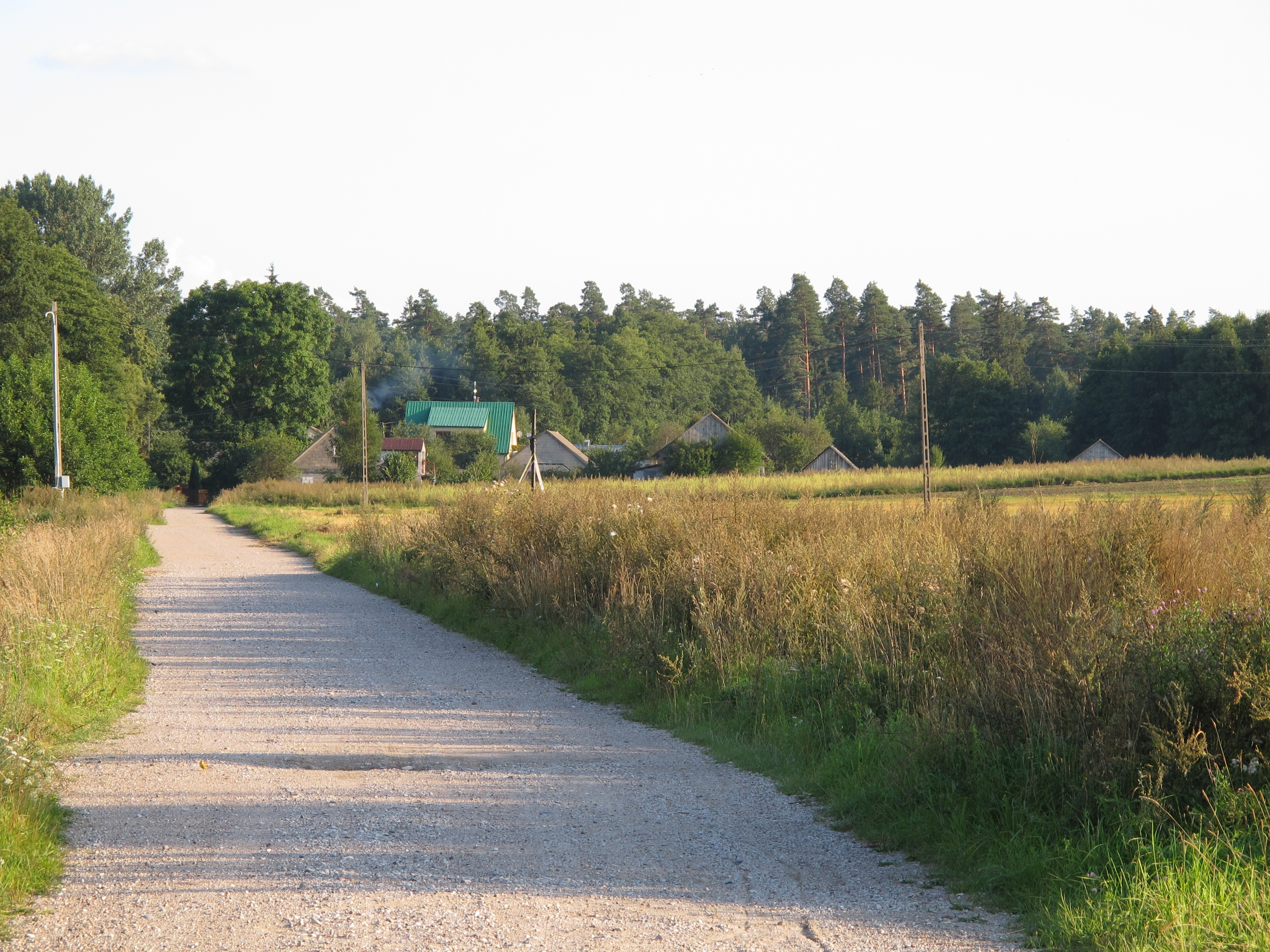
- Street of Mićkowa Hać

- Location within Poland
- Coordinates: 53°21′31″N 23°22′50″E
- Country: Poland
- Voivodeship: Podlaskie
- County: Sokółka
- Gmina: Sokółka

Mićkowa Hać [mit͡ɕˈkɔva ˈxat͡ɕ] is a village in the administrative district of Gmina Sokółka, within Sokółka County, Podlaskie Voivodeship, in north-eastern Poland, close to the border with Belarus.
