= Dąbrówka, Gmina Sokółka =

Village in Gmina Sokółka, Poland

Dąbrówka
- Village
- Location within Poland
- Coordinates: 53°27′08″N 23°22′37″E
- Country: Poland
- Voivodeship: Podlaskie
- County: Sokółka
- Gmina: Sokółka

Dąbrówka [dɔmˈbrufka] is a village in the administrative district of Gmina Sokółka, within Sokółka County, Podlaskie Voivodeship, in north-eastern Poland, close to the border with Belarus.
