= Nowinka, Gmina Sokółka =

Nowinka
- Village
- Location within Poland
- Coordinates: 53°23′08″N 23°23′12″E
- Country: Poland
- Voivodeship: Podlaskie
- County: Sokółka
- Gmina: Sokółka

Nowinka [nɔˈviŋka] is a village in the administrative district of Gmina Sokółka in Sokółka County, Podlaskie Voivodeship, in northeastern Poland, near the border with Belarus. The population in January 2022 was approximately 350.
