= Bobrowniki, Sokółka County =

Bobrowniki
- Village
- Location within Poland
- Coordinates: 53°23′N 23°36′E
- Country: Poland
- Voivodeship: Podlaskie
- County: Sokółka
- Gmina: Sokółka

Bobrowniki [bɔbrɔvˈniki] is a village in the administrative district of Gmina Sokółka, within Sokółka County, Podlaskie Voivodeship, in north-eastern Poland, close to the border with Belarus.
