= Ściebielec =

- Village
- Location within Poland
- Coordinates: 53°23′51″N 23°24′15″E
- Country: Poland
- Voivodeship: Podlaskie
- County: Sokółka
- Gmina: Sokółka

Ściebielec [ɕt͡ɕɛˈbjɛlɛt͡s] is a village in the administrative district of Gmina Sokółka, within Sokółka County, Podlaskie Voivodeship, in north-eastern Poland, close to the border with Belarus.

From 1975 until 1998, the village was part of the Białystok Voivodeship until administrative reform.
