= Lipowa Góra, Podlaskie Voivodeship =

Lipowa Góra
- Village
- Location within Poland
- Coordinates: 53°21′43″N 23°25′24″E
- Country: Poland
- Voivodeship: Podlaskie
- County: Sokółka
- Gmina: Sokółka

Lipowa Góra [liˈpɔva ˈɡura] is a village in the administrative district of Gmina Sokółka, within Sokółka County, Podlaskie Voivodeship, in north-eastern Poland, close to the border with Belarus.
