= Miejskie Nowiny =

- Village
- Location within Poland
- Coordinates: 53°23′8″N 23°24′31″E
- Country: Poland
- Voivodeship: Podlaskie
- County: Sokółka
- Gmina: Sokółka

Miejskie Nowiny [ˈmjɛi̯skʲɛ nɔˈvinɨ] is a village in the administrative district of Gmina Sokółka, within Sokółka County, Podlaskie Voivodeship, in north-eastern Poland, close to the border with Belarus.
