= Wilcza Jama, Sokółka County =

Wilcza Jama
- Village
- Location within Poland
- Coordinates: 53°23′23″N 23°23′23″E
- Country: Poland
- Voivodeship: Podlaskie
- County: Sokółka
- Gmina: Sokółka

Wilcza Jama [ˈvilt͡ʂa ˈjama] is a village in the administrative district of Gmina Sokółka, within Sokółka County, Podlaskie Voivodeship, in north-eastern Poland, close to the border with Belarus.
