= Kundzin Kościelny =

Village in Gmina Sokółka, Poland

- Village
- Location within Poland
- Coordinates: 53°26′19″N 23°35′10″E
- Country: Poland
- Voivodeship: Podlaskie
- County: Sokółka
- Gmina: Sokółka

Kundzin Kościelny [ˈkund͡ʑin kɔɕˈt͡ɕɛlnɨ] is a village in the administrative district of Gmina Sokółka, within Sokółka County, Podlaskie Voivodeship, in north-eastern Poland, close to the border with Belarus.
