= Lebiedzin, Sokółka County =

Lebiedzin
- Village
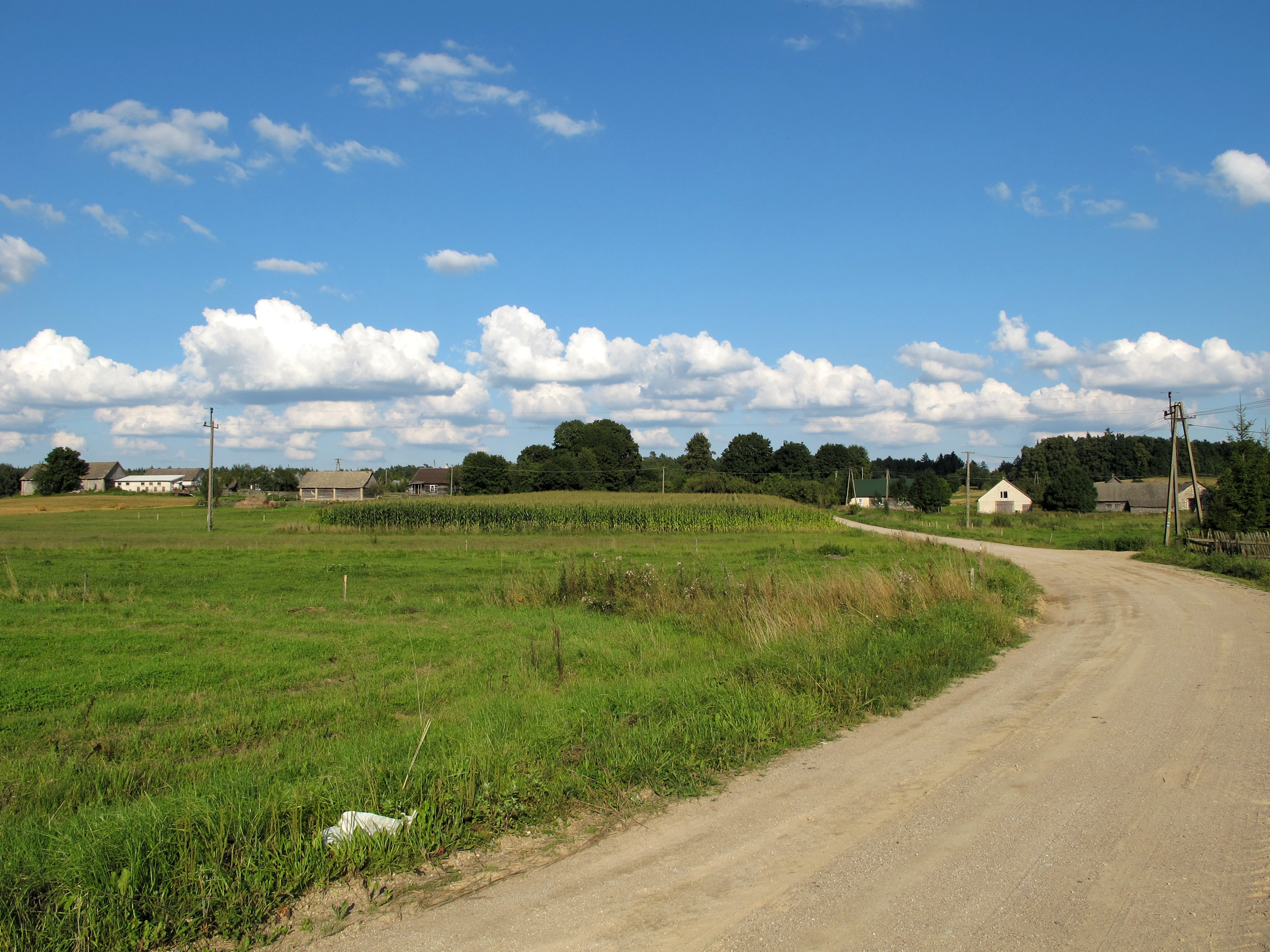
- Street of Lebiedzin, Sokółka County

- Location within Poland
- Coordinates: 53°24′43″N 23°20′39″E
- Country: Poland
- Voivodeship: Podlaskie
- County: Sokółka
- Gmina: Sokółka

Lebiedzin [lɛˈbjɛd͡ʑin] is a village in the administrative district of Gmina Sokółka, within Sokółka County, Podlaskie Voivodeship, in north-eastern Poland, close to the border with Belarus.
