= Zaśpicze =

- Village
- Location within Poland
- Coordinates: 53°24′50″N 23°40′11″E
- Country: Poland
- Voivodeship: Podlaskie
- County: Sokółka
- Gmina: Sokółka

Zaśpicze [zaɕˈpit͡ʂɛ] is a village in the administrative district of Gmina Sokółka, within Sokółka County, Podlaskie Voivodeship, in north-eastern Poland, close to the border with Belarus.
