= Gnidzin =

- Village
- Location within Poland
- Coordinates: 53°22′18″N 23°19′23″E
- Country: Poland
- Voivodeship: Podlaskie
- County: Sokółka
- Gmina: Sokółka

Gnidzin [ˈɡnid͡ʑin] is a village in the administrative district of Gmina Sokółka, within Sokółka County, Podlaskie Voivodeship, in north-eastern Poland, close to the border with Belarus.
