= Podjałówka, Sokółka County =

Village in Gmina Sokółka, Poland

Podjałówka
- Village
- Location within Poland
- Coordinates: 53°21′12″N 23°20′23″E
- Country: Poland
- Voivodeship: Podlaskie
- County: Sokółka
- Gmina: Sokółka

Podjałówka [pɔdjaˈwufka] is a village in the administrative district of Gmina Sokółka, within Sokółka County, Podlaskie Voivodeship, in north-eastern Poland, close to the border with Belarus.
