= Wysokie Laski =

- Village
- Location within Poland
- Coordinates: 53°22′N 23°29′E
- Country: Poland
- Voivodeship: Podlaskie
- County: Sokółka
- Gmina: Sokółka

Wysokie Laski (Polish pronunciation: [vɨˈsɔkʲɛ ˈlaskʲi]) is a village in the administrative district of Gmina Sokółka, within Sokółka County, Podlaskie Voivodeship, in north-eastern Poland, close to the border with Belarus.
