= Straż, Podlaskie Voivodeship =

Stráž
- Village
- Location within Poland
- Coordinates: 53°20′N 23°23′E
- Country: Poland
- Voivodeship: Podlaskie
- County: Sokółka
- Gmina: Sokółka

Straż [straʂ] is a village in the administrative district of Gmina Sokółka, within Sokółka County, Podlaskie Voivodeship, in north-eastern Poland, close to the border with Belarus.
