= Nowa Rozedranka =

- Village
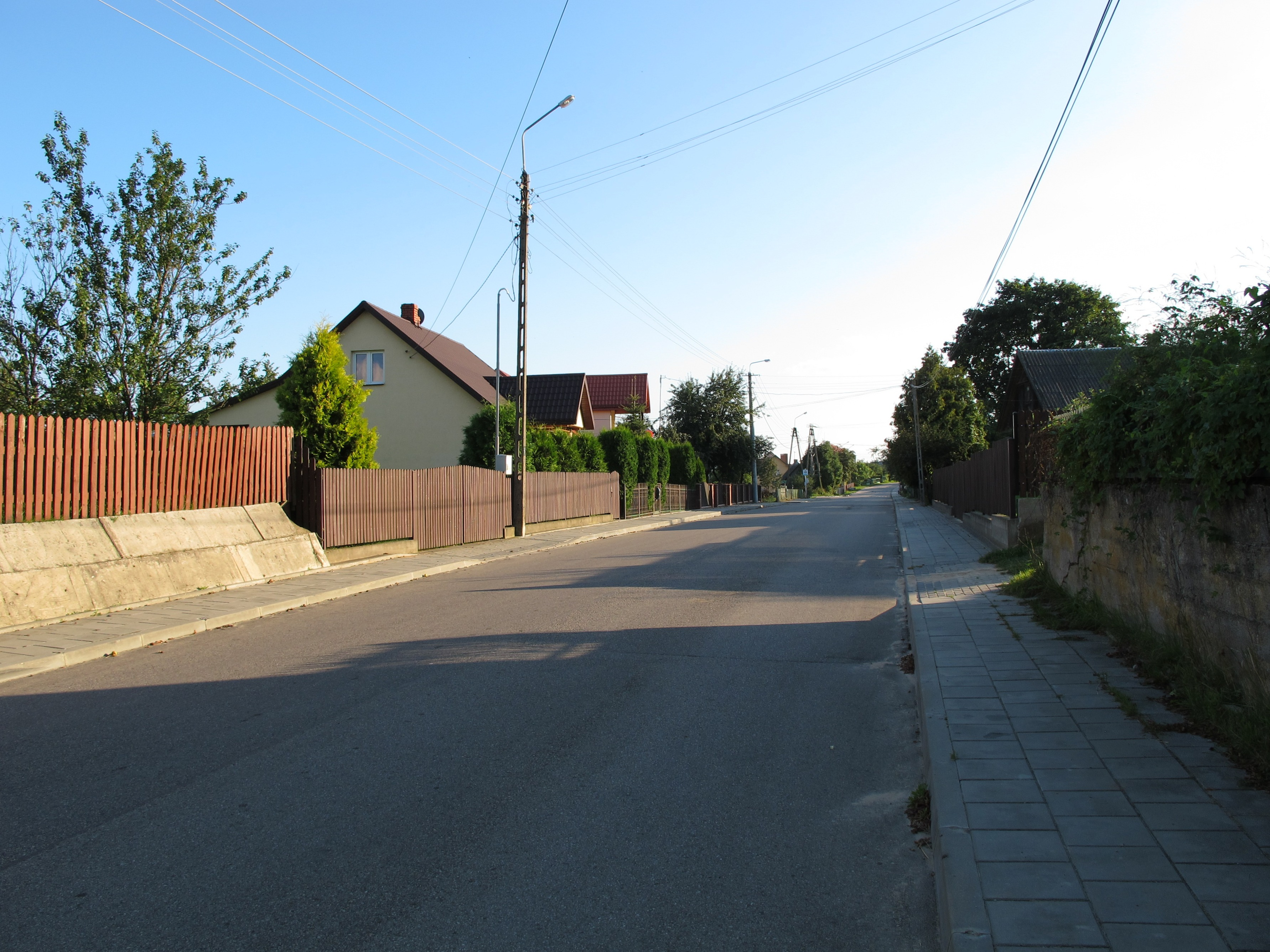
- Street of Nowa Rozedranka

- Location within Poland
- Coordinates: 53°21′41″N 23°21′44″E
- Country: Poland
- Voivodeship: Podlaskie
- County: Sokółka
- Gmina: Sokółka

Nowa Rozedranka [ˈnɔva rɔzɛˈdraŋka] is a village in the administrative district of Gmina Sokółka, within Sokółka County, Podlaskie Voivodeship, in north-eastern Poland, close to the border with Belarus.
