= Polanki, Podlaskie Voivodeship =

Polanki
- Village
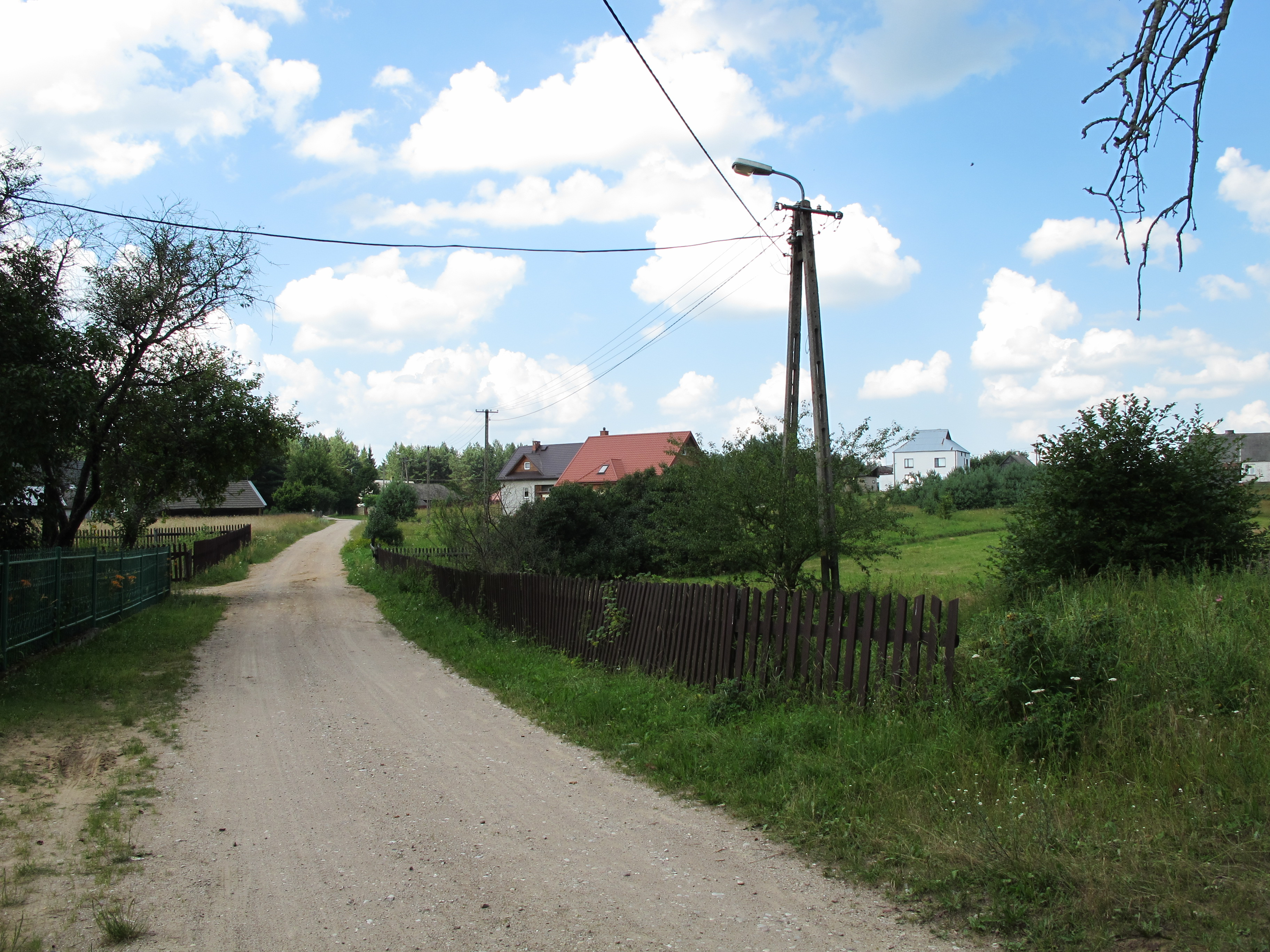
- Street of Polanki, Podlaskie Voivodeship

- Location within Poland
- Coordinates: 53°20′27.08″N 23°20′11.58″E
- Country: Poland
- Voivodeship: Podlaskie
- County: Sokółka
- Gmina: Sokółka

Polanki [pɔˈlaŋki] is a village in the administrative district of Gmina Sokółka, within Sokółka County, Podlaskie Voivodeship, in north-eastern Poland, close to the border with Belarus.
