= Kantorówka =

Village in Gmina Sokółka, Poland

- Village
- Location within Poland
- Coordinates: 53°22′51″N 23°22′08″E
- Country: Poland
- Voivodeship: Podlaskie
- County: Sokółka
- Gmina: Sokółka

Kantorówka [kantɔˈrufka] is a village in the administrative district of Gmina Sokółka, within Sokółka County, Podlaskie Voivodeship, in north-eastern Poland, close to the border with Belarus.
