= Słojniki =

- Village
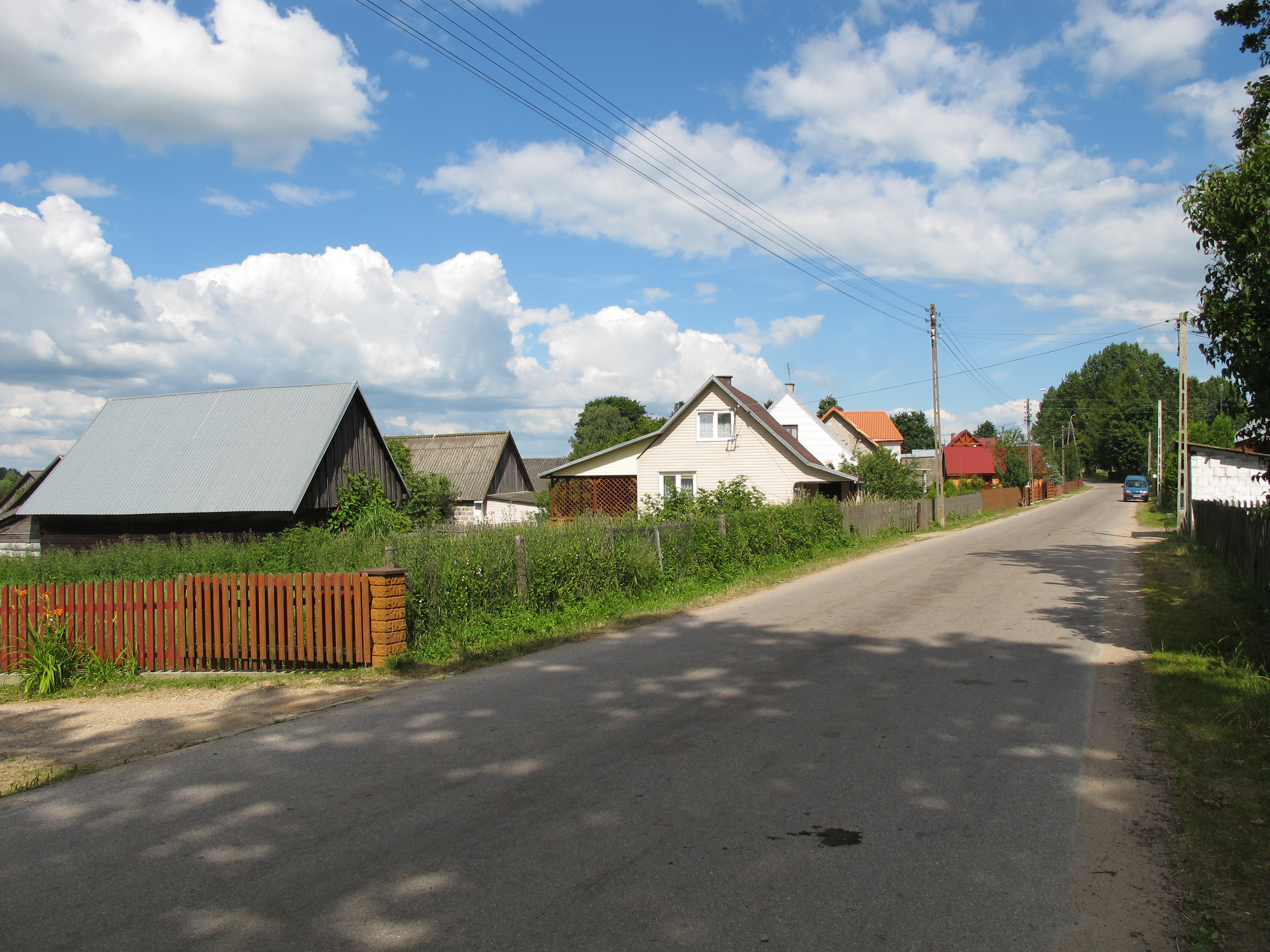

- Location within Poland
- Coordinates: 53°22′N 23°30′E
- Country: Poland
- Voivodeship: Podlaskie
- County: Sokółka
- Gmina: Sokółka

Słojniki [swɔi̯ˈniki] is a village in the administrative district of Gmina Sokółka, within Sokółka County, Podlaskie Voivodeship, in north-eastern Poland, close to the border with Belarus.
