= Żuki, Sokółka County =

Żuki
- Village
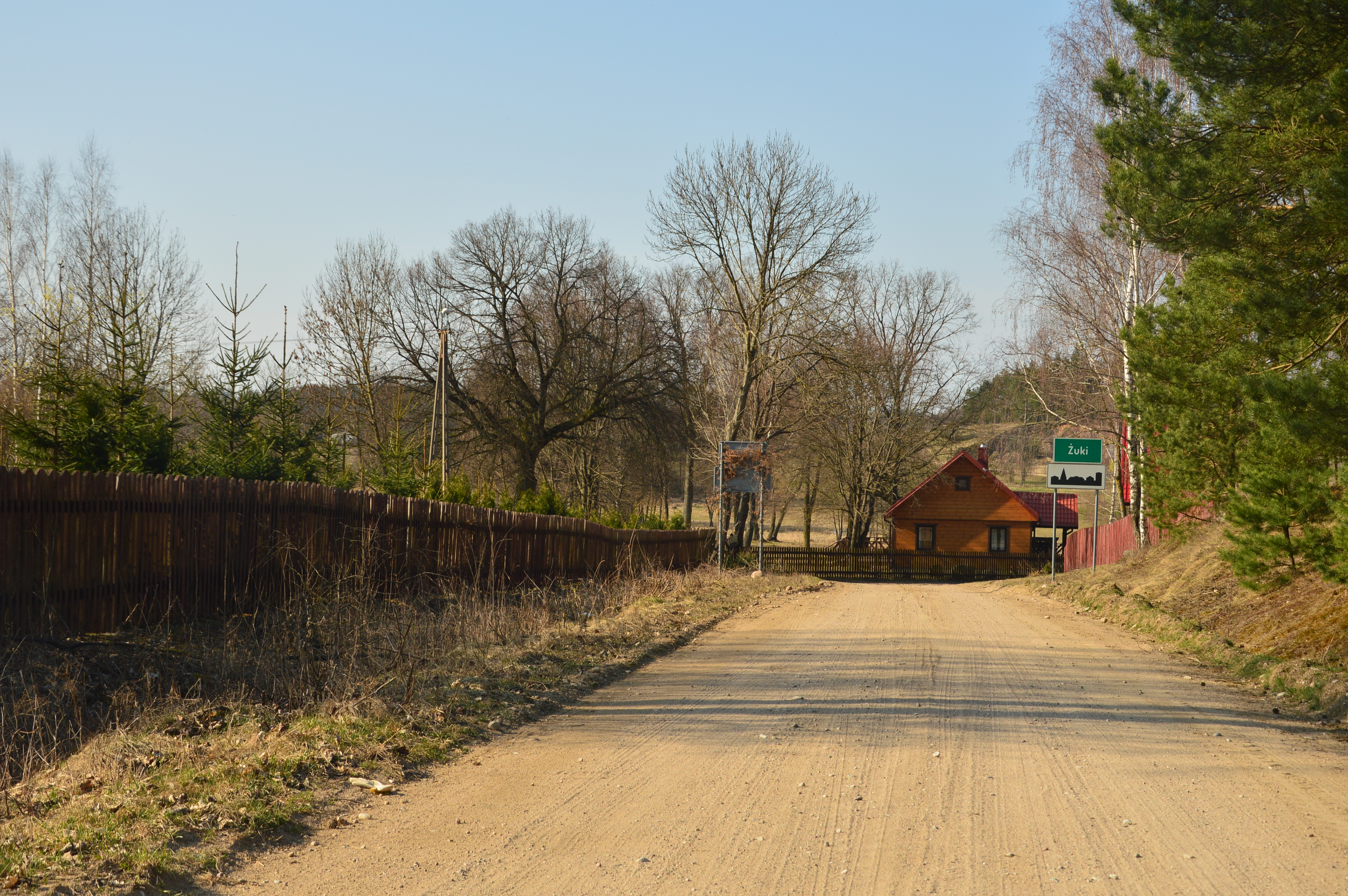

- Location within Poland
- Coordinates: 53°26′56″N 23°26′3″E
- Country: Poland
- Voivodeship: Podlaskie
- County: Sokółka
- Gmina: Sokółka
- Population: 80

Żuki [ˈʐukʲi] (Belarusian: Жукі, Zhuki) is a village in the administrative district of Gmina Sokółka, within Sokółka County, Podlaskie Voivodeship, in north-eastern Poland, close to the border with Belarus.
