= Szőr =

Szőr is a surname. Notable people with the surname include:

- Levente Szőr (born 2001), Hungarian football left winger
- Péter Szőr (1970–2013), Hungarian computer security researcher

== See also ==
- Szor, a surname
