= Hałe =

- Village
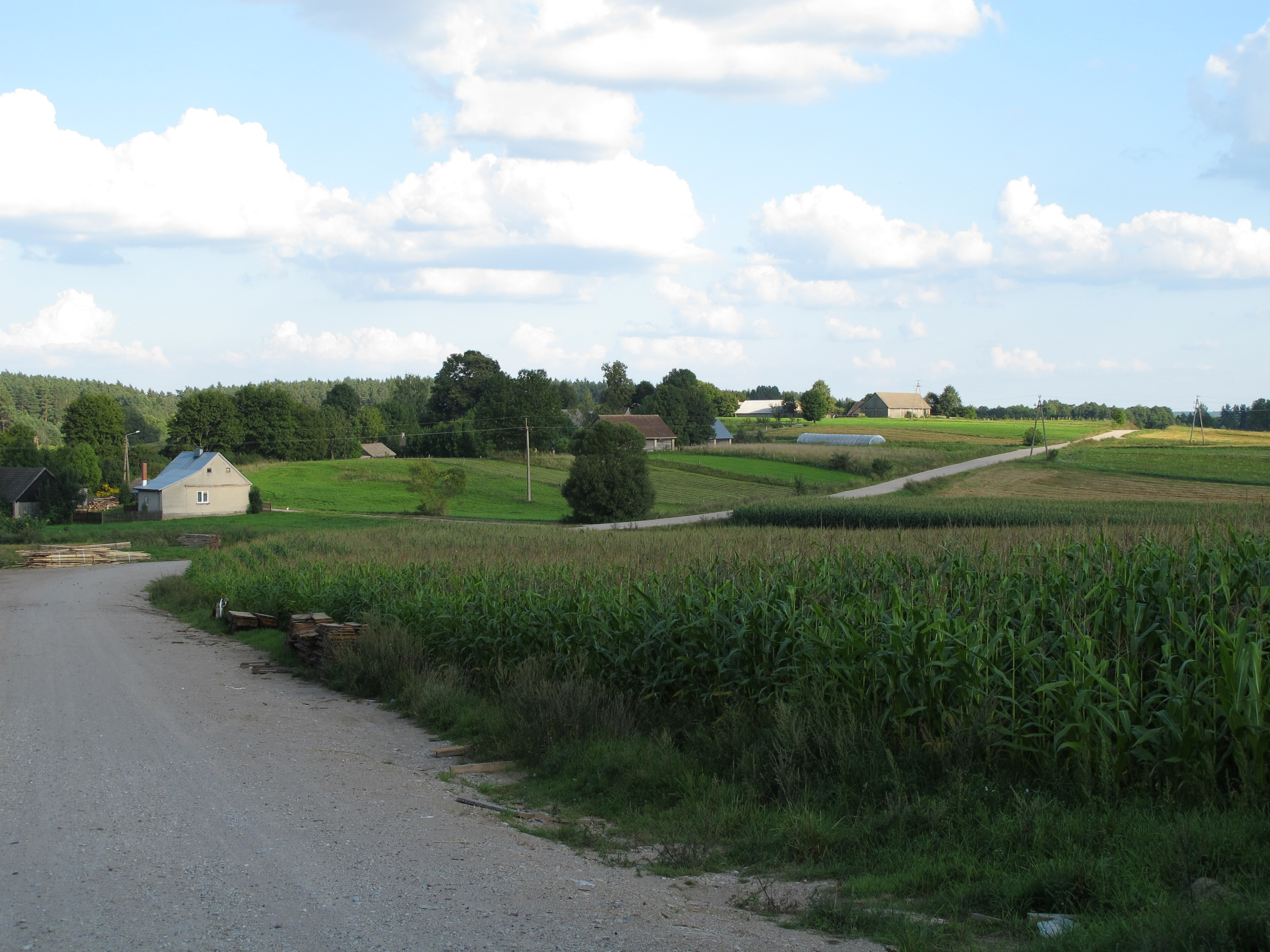
- View of Hałe Village, Poland

- Location within Poland
- Coordinates: 53°23′18″N 23°20′47″E
- Country: Poland
- Voivodeship: Podlaskie
- County: Sokółka
- Gmina: Sokółka

Hałe [ˈxawɛ] is a village in the administrative district of Gmina Sokółka, within Sokółka County, Podlaskie Voivodeship, in north-eastern Poland, close to the border with Belarus.
