= Nowa Kamionka, Sokółka County =

Nowa Kamionka
- Village
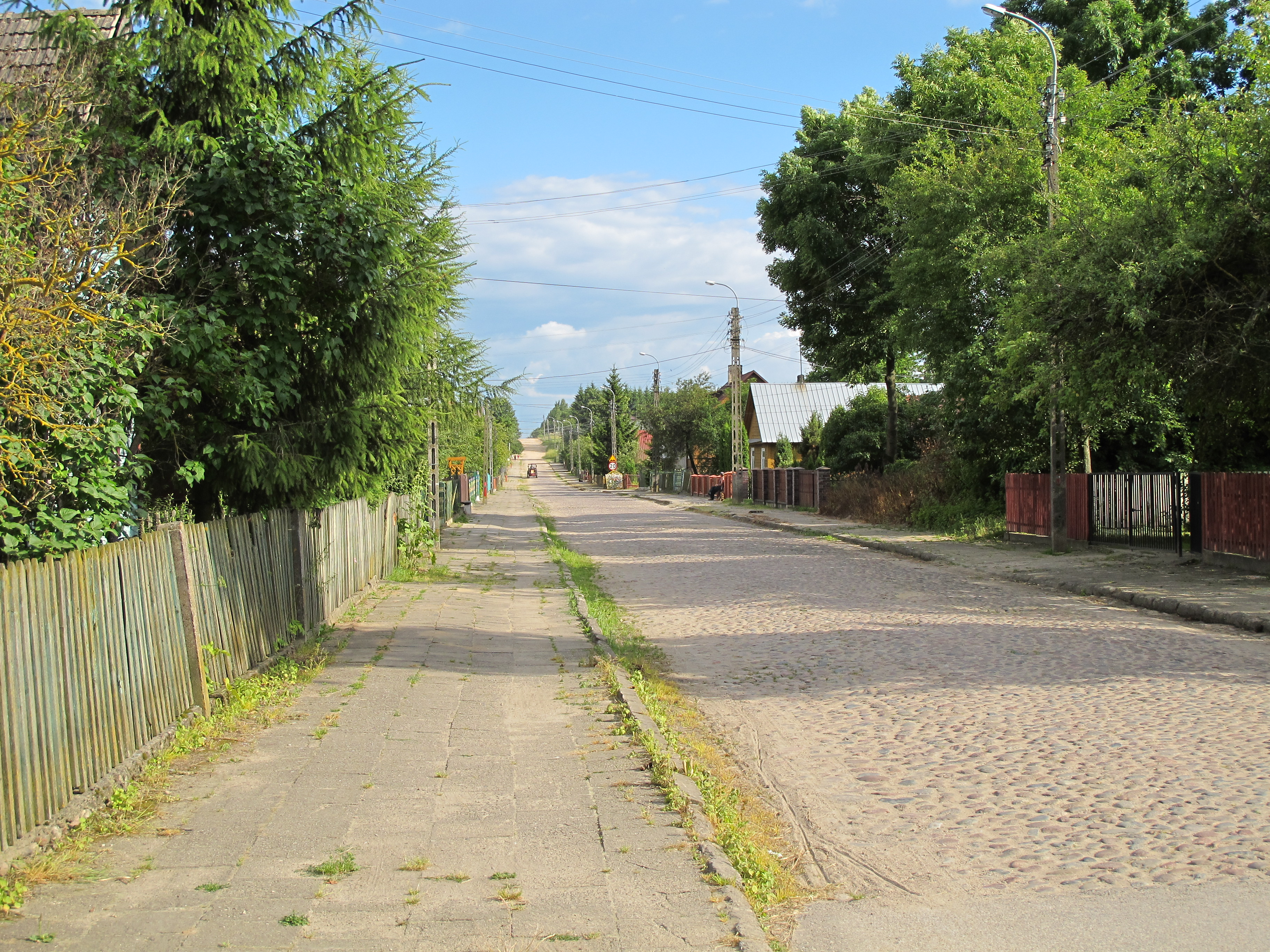
- Street of Nowa Kamionka Village, Sokółka County

- Location within Poland
- Coordinates: 53°23′17.31″N 23°31′47.27″E
- Country: Poland
- Voivodeship: Podlaskie
- County: Sokółka
- Gmina: Sokółka

Nowa Kamionka [ˈnɔva kaˈmjɔŋka] is a village in the administrative district of Gmina Sokółka, within Sokółka County, Podlaskie Voivodeship, in north-eastern Poland, close to the border with Belarus.
