= Bogusze, Sokółka County =

Bogusze
- Village
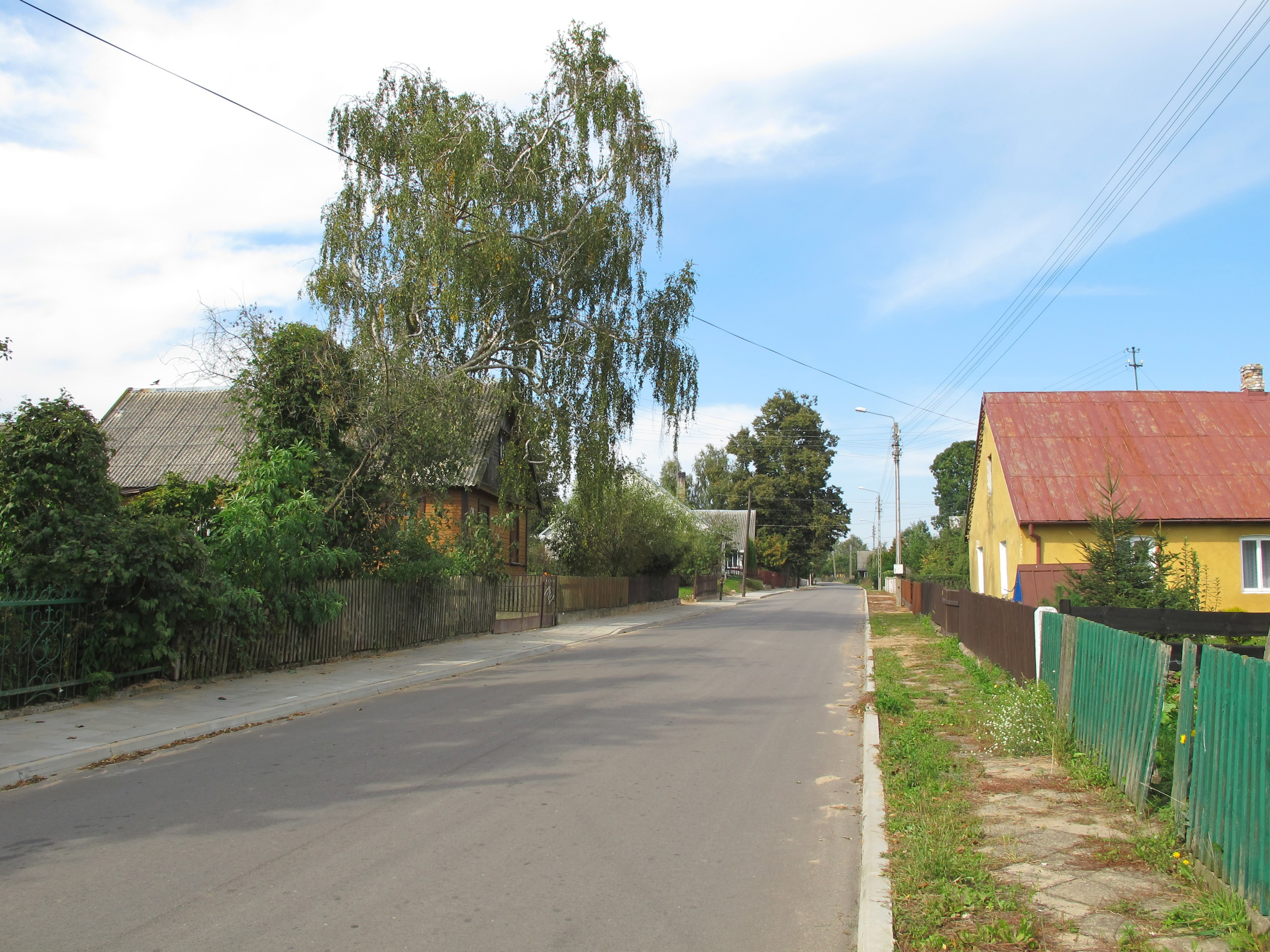

- Location within Poland
- Coordinates: 53°25′N 23°26′E
- Country: Poland
- Voivodeship: Podlaskie
- County: Sokółka
- Gmina: Sokółka

Bogusze [bɔˈɡuʂɛ] is a village in the administrative district of Gmina Sokółka, within Sokółka County, Podlaskie Voivodeship, in north-eastern Poland, close to the border with Belarus.
