= Synkowce =

- Village
- Location within Poland
- Coordinates: 53°37′N 23°30′E
- Country: Poland
- Voivodeship: Podlaskie
- County: Sokółka
- Gmina: Nowy Dwór

Synkowce [sɨŋˈkɔft͡sɛ] is a village in the administrative district of Gmina Nowy Dwór, within Sokółka County, Podlaskie Voivodeship, in north-eastern Poland, close to the border with Belarus.

== History ==
According to the 1921 Census, the village of Synkowce had 23 houses inhabited by 140 people (75 women and 65 men). The vast majority of the village's inhabitants identified with Eastern Orthodoxy (124 people), while the rest identified with the Latin Church (16 people). The religious division of the village's inhabitants matched their national and ethnic structure, as 124 inhabitants identified as Belarusians, and the remaining 16 identified as Polish people. In the mentioned period Synkowce was located in Gmina Sidra.

In the years 1975–1998 the town administratively belonged to the Białystok Voivodeship.

== Other ==
In 2014, ethnographic research was conducted in Synkowce under the supervision of Stefan Kopa, which resulted in the publication of a monograph entitled Belarusian Songs of the Sokółka Land. As part of the research, Belarusian folk songs that are lost with the passing of the oldest generation of village residents were written down and digitized. The research was carried out thanks to a grant from Minister of Administration and Digitization.

The local Orthodox community is subject to the St. Nicholas Parish in nearby Nowy Dwór. While the religious of the Latin Church belong to the Divine Providence Parish in Siderka
