= Aul (disambiguation) =

An aul is a type of fortified village found throughout the Caucasus and Central Asia.

Aul or AUL may also refer to:

== Places ==
- Aul of Omurtag in Bulgaria; see Palace of Omurtag
- Aul Kochalyar, a village in the Khizi Rayon of Azerbaijan; see Kechallyar
- Piz Aul, a mountain of the Lepontine Alps

== Acronyms and abbreviations ==
- aul, an abbreviation for Aulua language
- Aquinas University of Legazpi; see Aquinas University
- Americans United for Life, an American anti-abortion organization
- Arctic Umiaq Line, a passenger and cargo coastal ferry in Greenland
- Arts, Sciences and Technology University in Lebanon
- Cork AUL, an Irish junior soccer league
- Athletic Union League (Dublin), Ireland, a soccer league in Dublin's Northside

== See also ==
- Auls, a settlement in Gmina Kuźnica, Sokółka County, Podlaskie Voivodeship, Poland; see Wojnowce
- Auld (disambiguation)
- Awl (disambiguation)
- All (disambiguation)
- Al (disambiguation)
