= Jałówka =

Jałówka may refer to the following places in Podlaskie Voivodeship, north-east Poland:

- Jałówka, Gmina Michałowo
- Jałówka, Gmina Supraśl
- Jałówka, Gmina Dąbrowa Białostocka
- Jałówka, Gmina Sidra
- Jałówka, Gmina Sokółka
- Jałówka, site of a Jewish cemetery in Narewka
