= Majewo =

Majewo may refer to the following places:

- Majewo, Podlaskie Voivodeship (north-east Poland)
- Majewo, Tczew County in Pomeranian Voivodeship (north Poland)
- Majewo, Warmian-Masurian Voivodeship (north Poland)
