= Litwinki =

Litwinki may refer to:

- Litwinki, Podlaskie Voivodeship, Poland
- Litwinki, Warmian-Masurian Voivodeship, Poland
