= Bieniasze =

Bieniasze refers to the following places in Poland:

- Bieniasze, Podlaskie Voivodeship
- Bieniasze, Warmian-Masurian Voivodeship
