= Kowale, Sokółka County =

Kowale
- Village
- Location within Poland
- Coordinates: 53°31′57″N 23°38′04″E
- Country: Poland
- Voivodeship: Podlaskie
- County: Sokółka
- Gmina: Kuźnica

Kowale [kɔˈvalɛ] is a village in the administrative district of Gmina Kuźnica, within Sokółka County, Podlaskie Voivodeship, in north-eastern Poland, close to the border with Belarus.
