= Wołkusze =

- Village
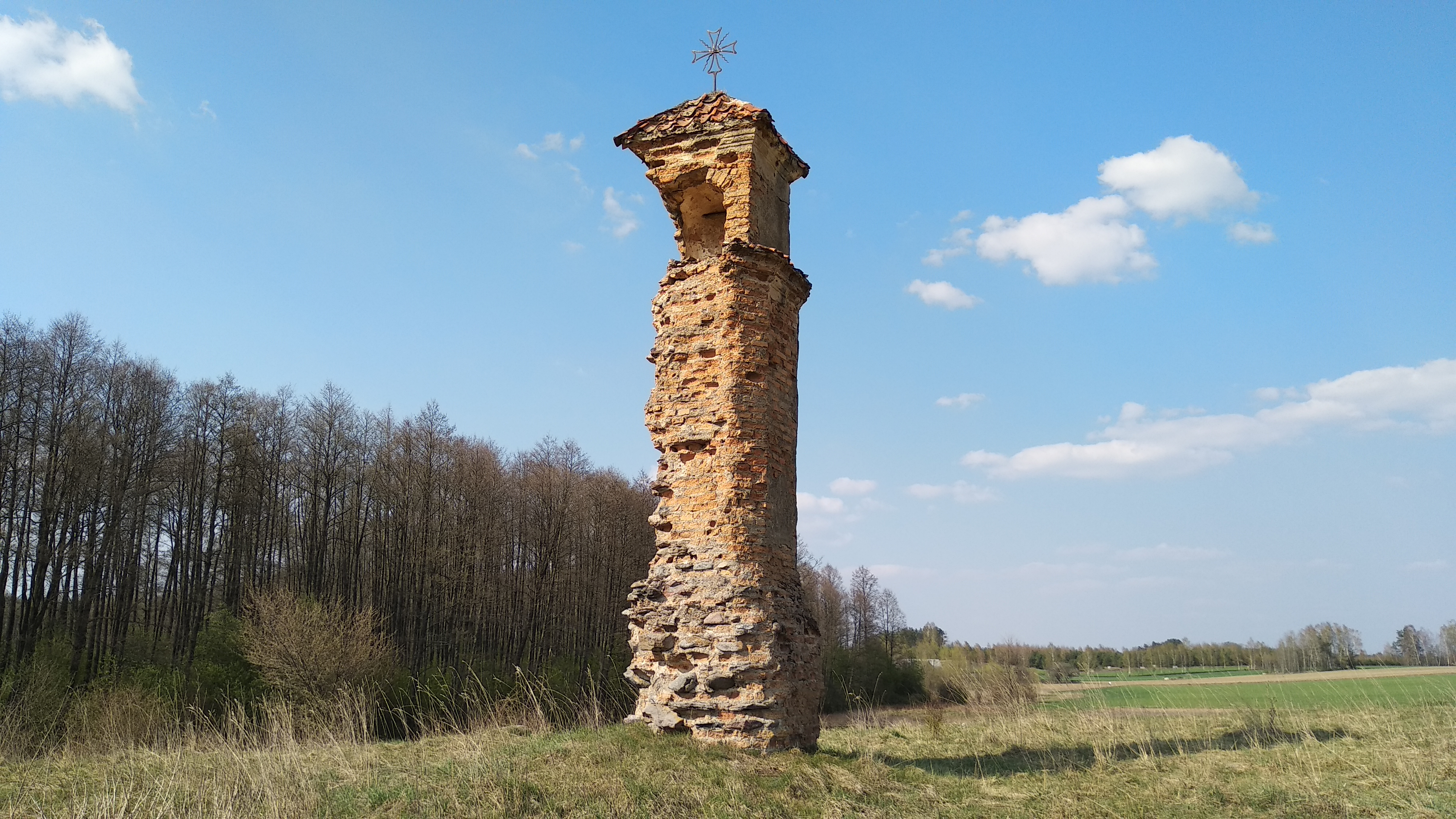
- Boundary marker in Wołkusze

- Location within Poland
- Coordinates: 53°29′N 23°35′E
- Country: Poland
- Voivodeship: Podlaskie
- County: Sokółka
- Gmina: Kuźnica

Wołkusze [vɔu̯ˈkuʂɛ] is a village in the administrative district of Gmina Kuźnica, within Sokółka County, Podlaskie Voivodeship, in north-eastern Poland, close to the border with Belarus.
