= Bobra Wielka =

- Village
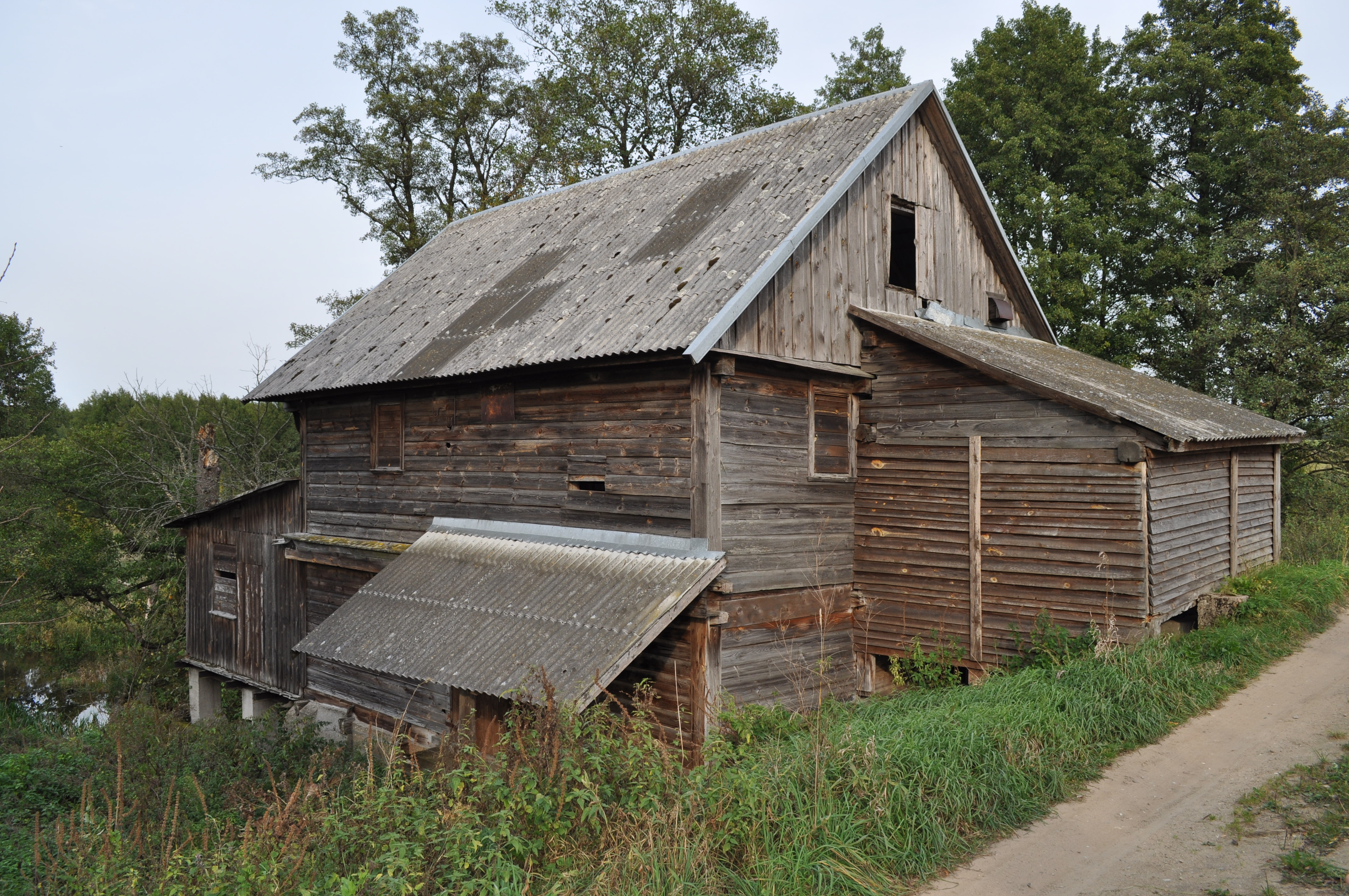

- Location within Poland
- Coordinates: 53°29′36″N 23°31′49″E
- Country: Poland
- Voivodeship: Podlaskie
- County: Sokółka
- Gmina: Nowy Dwór

Bobra Wielka [ˈbɔbra ˈvjɛlka] is a village in the administrative district of Gmina Nowy Dwór, within Sokółka County, Podlaskie Voivodeship, in north-eastern Poland, close to the border with Belarus.
