= Grzebienie-Kolonia =

- Village
- Location within Poland
- Coordinates: 53°37′12″N 23°31′3″E
- Country: Poland
- Voivodeship: Podlaskie
- County: Sokółka
- Gmina: Nowy Dwór

Grzebienie-Kolonia [ɡʐɛˈbjɛɲɛ kɔˈlɔɲa] is a village in the administrative district of Gmina Nowy Dwór, within Sokółka County, Podlaskie Voivodeship, in north-eastern Poland, close to the border with Belarus.
