= Racewo =

- Village
- Location within Poland
- Coordinates: 53°29′N 23°27′E
- Country: Poland
- Voivodeship: Podlaskie
- County: Sokółka
- Gmina: Sidra

Racewo [raˈt͡sɛvɔ] is a village in the administrative district of Gmina Sidra, within Sokółka County, Podlaskie Voivodeship, in north-eastern Poland.
