= Gudebsk =

- Village
- Location within Poland
- Coordinates: 53°36′02″N 23°27′02″E
- Country: Poland
- Voivodeship: Podlaskie
- County: Sokółka
- Gmina: Sidra

Gudebsk [ˈɡudɛpsk] is a village in the administrative district of Gmina Sidra, within Sokółka County, Podlaskie Voivodeship, in north-eastern Poland.
