= Wandzin, Podlaskie Voivodeship =

Wandzin
- Settlement
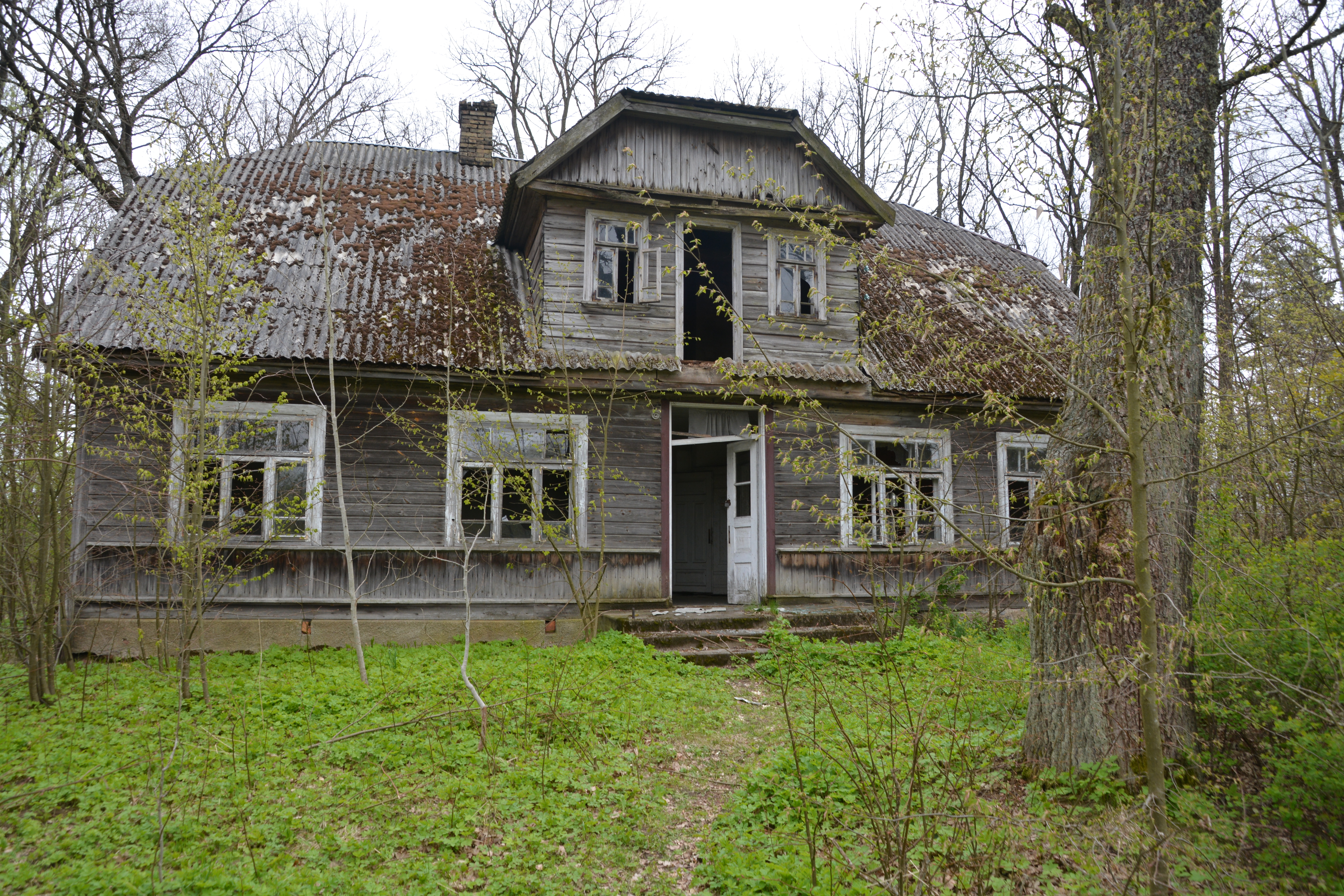
- Manor in Wandzin

- Location within Poland
- Coordinates: 53°33′12″N 23°27′58″E
- Country: Poland
- Voivodeship: Podlaskie
- County: Sokółka
- Gmina: Sidra

Wandzin [ˈvand͡ʑin] is a settlement in the administrative district of Gmina Sidra, within Sokółka County, Podlaskie Voivodeship, in north-eastern Poland.
