= Zacisze, Sokółka County =

Zacisze
- Settlement
- Location within Poland
- Coordinates: 53°33′07″N 23°25′07″E
- Country: Poland
- Voivodeship: Podlaskie
- County: Sokółka
- Gmina: Sidra

Zacisze [zaˈt͡ɕiʂɛ] is a settlement in the administrative district of Gmina Sidra, within Sokółka County, Podlaskie Voivodeship, located in north-eastern Poland.
