= Leśnica, Podlaskie Voivodeship =

Leśnica
- Settlement
- Location within Poland
- Coordinates: 53°36′27″N 23°28′29″E
- Country: Poland
- Voivodeship: Podlaskie
- County: Sokółka
- Gmina: Nowy Dwór

Leśnica [lɛɕˈnit͡sa] is a settlement in the administrative district of Gmina Nowy Dwór, within Sokółka County, Podlaskie Voivodeship, in north-eastern Poland, close to the border with Belarus.
