= Rogacze-Kolonia =

- Village
- Location within Poland
- Coordinates: 53°43′02″N 23°33′02″E
- Country: Poland
- Voivodeship: Podlaskie
- County: Sokółka
- Gmina: Nowy Dwór

Rogacze-Kolonia [rɔˈɡat͡ʂɛ kɔˈlɔɲa] is a village in the administrative district of Gmina Nowy Dwór, within Sokółka County, Podlaskie Voivodeship, in north-eastern Poland, close to the border with Belarus.
