= Starowlany =

- Village
- Location within Poland
- Coordinates: 53°30′N 23°33′E
- Country: Poland
- Voivodeship: Podlaskie
- County: Sokółka
- Gmina: Kuźnica

Starowlany [starɔˈvlanɨ] is a village in the administrative district of Gmina Kuźnica, within Sokółka County, Podlaskie Voivodeship, in north-eastern Poland, close to the border with Belarus.
