= Słomianka, Sokółka County =

Słomianka
- Village
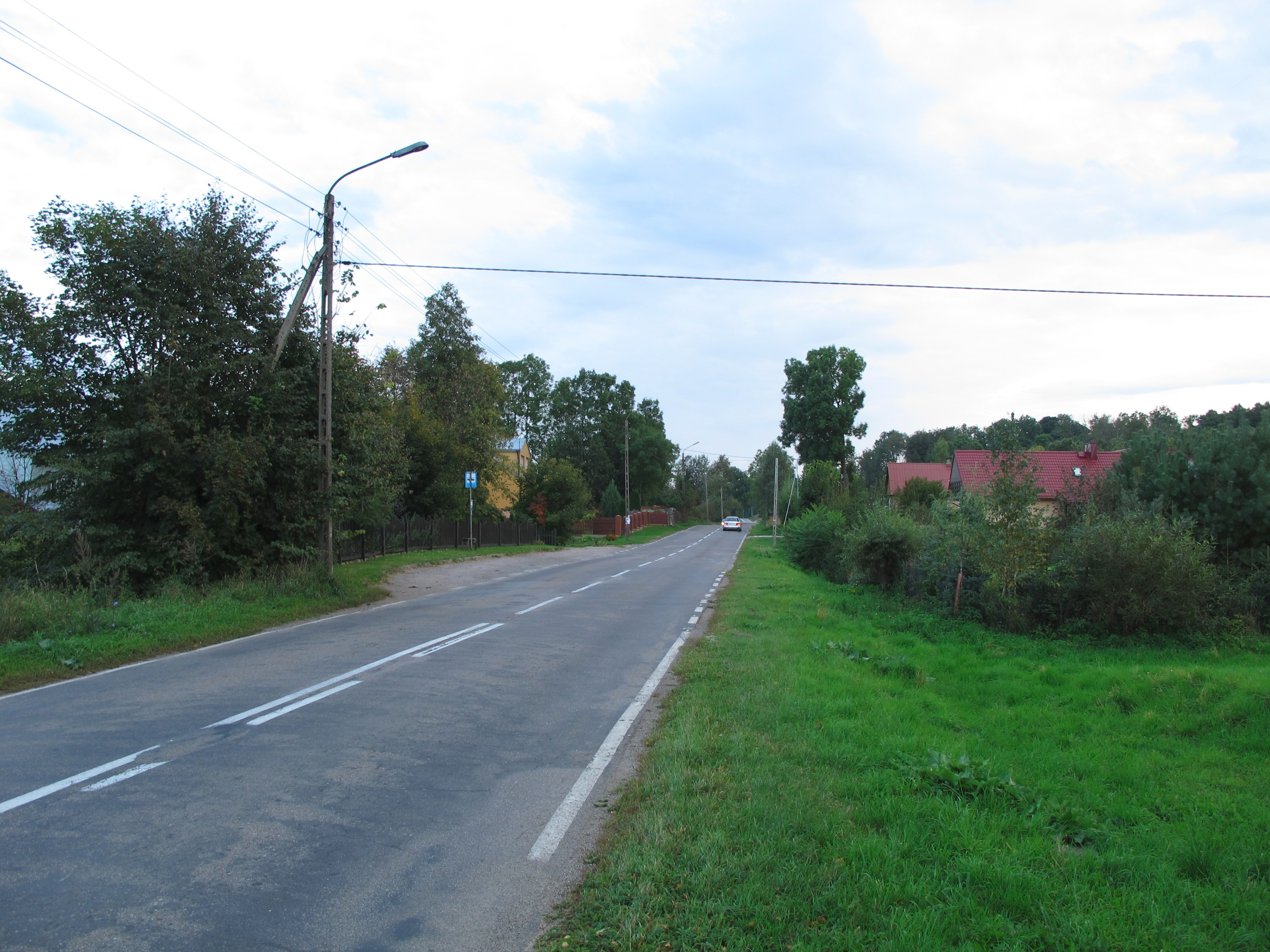

- Location within Poland
- Coordinates: 53°33′01″N 23°25′01″E
- Country: Poland
- Voivodeship: Podlaskie
- County: Sokółka
- Gmina: Sidra

Słomianka [swɔˈmjaŋka] is a village in the administrative district of Gmina Sidra, within Sokółka County, Podlaskie Voivodeship, in north-eastern Poland.
