= Kruglany =

- Village
- Location within Poland
- Coordinates: 53°29′10″N 23°37′50″E
- Country: Poland
- Voivodeship: Podlaskie
- County: Sokółka
- Gmina: Kuźnica

Kruglany [kruˈɡlanɨ] is a village in the administrative district of Gmina Kuźnica, within Sokółka County, Podlaskie Voivodeship, in north-eastern Poland, close to the border with Belarus. In May 1945, in the Łosośna colony (part of Kruglany), members of the Freedom and Independence Association murdered Józef Czeremcha, his wife Anna and their 18-year-old son Anatol. On the same night, they also murdered Aleksander Kuryła in his home.
