= Saczkowce =

- Village
- Location within Poland
- Coordinates: 53°35′N 23°38′E
- Country: Poland
- Voivodeship: Podlaskie
- County: Sokółka
- Gmina: Kuźnica
- Population: 190

Saczkowce [sat͡ʂˈkɔft͡sɛ] is a village in the administrative district of Gmina Kuźnica, within Sokółka County, Podlaskie Voivodeship, in north-eastern Poland, close to the border with Belarus.
