= Achrymowce =

- Village
- Location within Poland
- Coordinates: 53°30′42″N 23°32′49″E
- Country: Poland
- Voivodeship: Podlaskie
- County: Sokółka
- Gmina: Kuźnica

Population
  - Total: 100
- Time zone: UTC+1 (CET)
  - Summer (DST): UTC+2 (CEST)

Achrymowce [axrɨˈmɔft͡sɛ] is a village in the administrative district of Gmina Kuźnica, within Sokółka County, Podlaskie Voivodeship, in north-eastern Poland, close to the border with Belarus.

== History ==
Four Polish citizens were murdered by Nazi Germany in the village during World War II.
