= Jałówka-Kolonia =

- Village
- Location within Poland
- Coordinates: 53°30′42″N 23°22′14″E
- Country: Poland
- Voivodeship: Podlaskie
- County: Sokółka
- Gmina: Sidra

Jałówka-Kolonia ([jaˈwufka kɔˈlɔɲa]) is a village in the administrative district of Gmina Sidra, within Sokółka County, Podlaskie Voivodeship, in north-eastern Poland.
