= Gmina Nowy Dwór =

Gmina Nowy Dwór Nowy Dwór Commune
- Gmina
- Coat of arms

- Gmina Nowy Dwór within the Sokółka County
- Coordinates (Nowy Dwór): 53°38′N 23°33′E
- Country: Poland
- Voivodeship: Podlaskie
- County: Sokółka
- Seat: Nowy Dwór

Area
  - Total: 120.88 km^{2} (46.67 sq mi)

Population (2006)
  - Total: 2,927
  - Density: 24.21/km^{2} (62.71/sq mi)

Gmina Nowy Dwór is a rural gmina (administrative district) in Sokółka County, Podlaskie Voivodeship, in north-eastern Poland, on the border with Belarus. Its seat is the village of Nowy Dwór, which lies approximately 27 kilometres (17 mi) north of Sokółka and 63 km (39 mi) north-east of the regional capital Białystok.

The gmina covers an area of 120.88 square kilometres (46.7 sq mi), and as of 2006 its total population is 2,927.

== Villages ==
Gmina Nowy Dwór contains the villages and settlements of Bieniowce, Bieniowce-Kolonia, Bobra Wielka, Butrymowce, Chilmony, Chorużowce, Chwojnowszczyzna, Chworościany, Dubaśno, Grzebienie-Kolonia, Jaginty, Koniuszki, Kudrawka, Leśnica, Nowy Dwór, Plebanowce, Ponarlica, Rogacze-Kolonia, Sieruciowce, Synkowce and Talki.

== Neighbouring gminas ==
Gmina Nowy Dwór is bordered by the gminas of Dąbrowa Białostocka, Kuźnica, Lipsk and Sidra. It also borders Belarus.
