= Sidra, Sokółka County =

Sidra
- Village
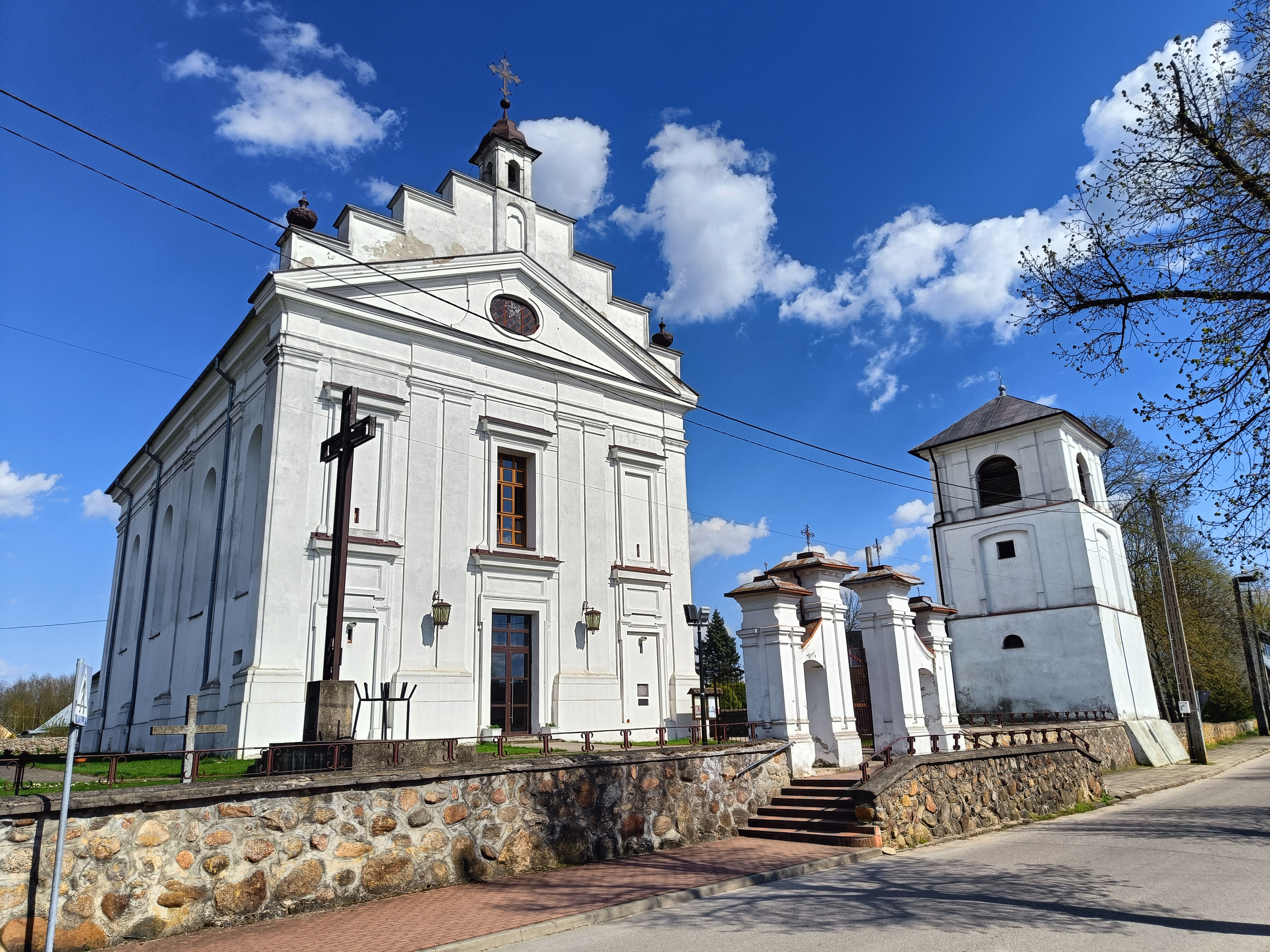
- Church of Holy Trinity

- Location within Poland
- Coordinates: 53°33′11″N 23°26′55″E
- Country: Poland
- Voivodeship: Podlaskie
- County: Sokółka
- Gmina: Sidra

Population
  - Total: 730
- Time zone: UTC+1 (CET)
  - Summer (DST): UTC+2 (CEST)
- Vehicle registration: BSK

Sidra [ˈɕidra] is a village in Sokółka County, Podlaskie Voivodeship, in north-eastern Poland. It is the seat of the gmina (administrative district) called Gmina Sidra.

== History ==
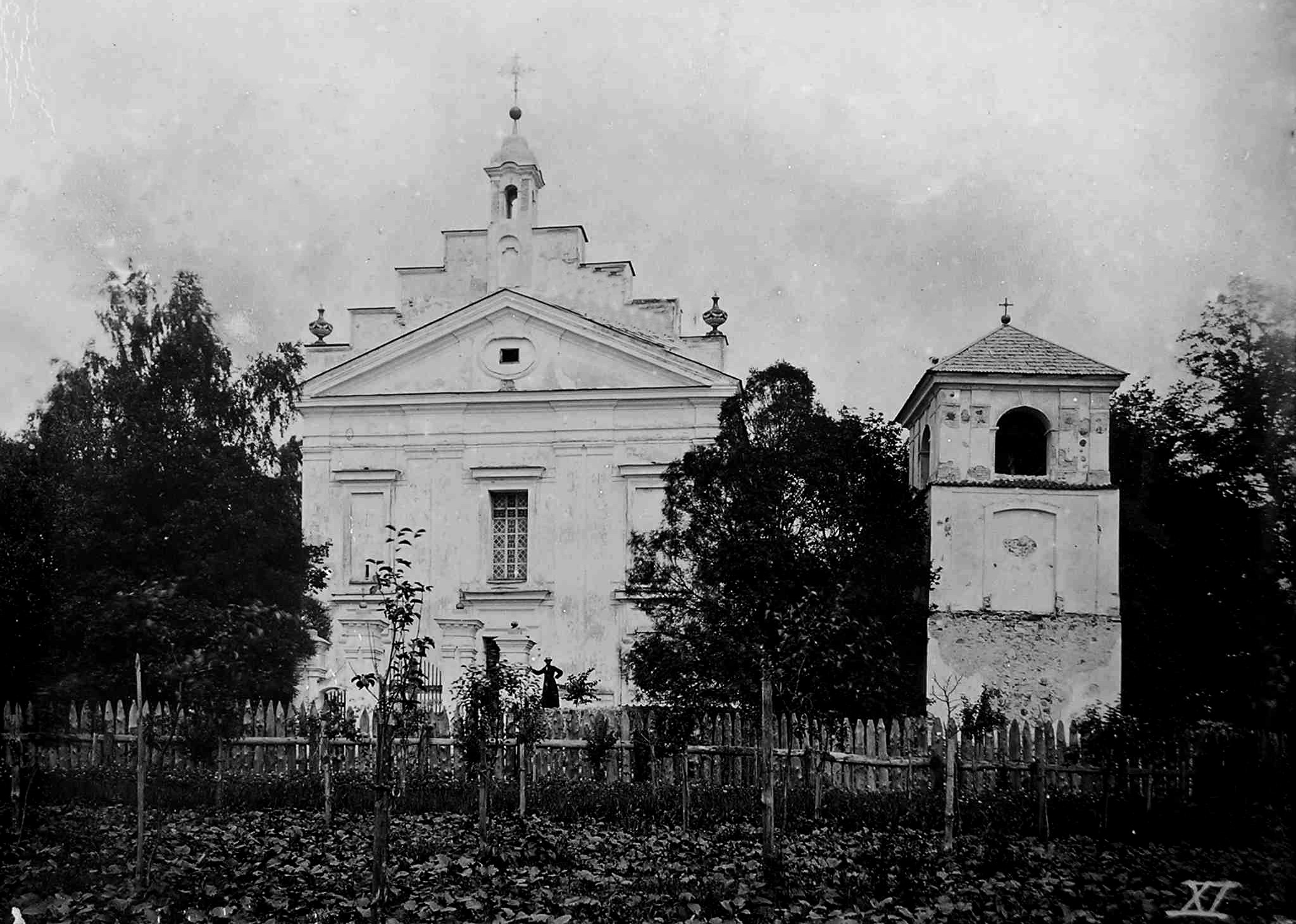
Sidra in c. 1900

The bastion castle in Sidra was built around 1566, funded by the great Lithuanian chancellor Eustachy Wołłowicz, on the site of the wooden fortified manor house of the Radziwiłł and Gasztołd families. The castle, surrounded by auxiliary buildings and a wooden defensive perimeter, was destroyed during the Swedish invasion. In the mid-17th century, the residence was rebuilt into a palace by the Potocki family. The next reconstructions took place in the 18th and 19th centuries, carried out by the Szczuk and Potocki families. The residence was destroyed in the 19th century and today only fragments of the foundations remain. Archaeological research was carried out in 1970–71.

A Jewish population of 455 lived in the village in 1921.

Following the German-Soviet invasion of Poland, which started World War II in September 1939, the village was initially occupied by the Soviet Union until 1941, and then by Germany. The wooden synagogue built at the turn of the 17th and 18th centuries was burned down by the Germans in 1942. In 1944, Sidra was restored to Poland, although with a Soviet-installed communist regime, which stayed in power until the Fall of Communism in the 1980s. The Polish anti-communist resistance was active in Sidra, and in 1945 it raided a local communist police station.
