= Kalwińszczyna =

- Village
- Location within Poland
- Coordinates: 53°36′05″N 23°27′05″E
- Country: Poland
- Voivodeship: Podlaskie
- County: Sokółka
- Gmina: Sidra

Kalwińszczyna [kalviɲʂˈt͡ʂɨna] is a village in the administrative district of Gmina Sidra, within Sokółka County, Podlaskie Voivodeship, in north-eastern Poland.

In 1975–1998, the village belonged administratively to the Białystok Voivodeship.
