= Talki, Podlaskie Voivodeship =

Talki
- Settlement
- Location within Poland
- Coordinates: 53°36′50″N 23°32′43″E
- Country: Poland
- Voivodeship: Podlaskie
- County: Sokółka
- Gmina: Nowy Dwór

Talki [ˈtalki] is a settlement in the administrative district of Gmina Nowy Dwór, within Sokółka County, Podlaskie Voivodeship, in north-eastern Poland, close to the border with Belarus.
