= Wołyńce, Sokółka County =

Wołyńce
- Village
- Location within Poland
- Coordinates: 53°34′06″N 23°37′29″E
- Country: Poland
- Voivodeship: Podlaskie
- County: Sokółka
- Gmina: Kuźnica

Wołyńce ([vɔˈwɨɲt͡sɛ]; Lithuanian: Valinčiai) is a village in the administrative district of Gmina Kuźnica, within Sokółka County, Podlaskie Voivodeship, in north-eastern Poland, close to the border with Belarus.

== Sources ==
- VLKK (2002). "Atvirkštinis lietuvių kalboje vartojamų tradicinių Lenkijos vietovardžių formų sąrašas" (PDF). VLKK (in Lithuanian). Archived from the original (PDF) on 2012-02-14.
