= Sieruciowce =

- Village
- Location within Poland
- Coordinates: 53°40′N 23°32′E
- Country: Poland
- Voivodeship: Podlaskie
- County: Sokółka
- Gmina: Nowy Dwór

Sieruciowce [ɕɛruˈt͡ɕɔft͡sɛ] is a village in the administrative district of Gmina Nowy Dwór, within Sokółka County, Podlaskie Voivodeship, in north-eastern Poland, close to the border with Belarus.
