= Holiki =

- Village
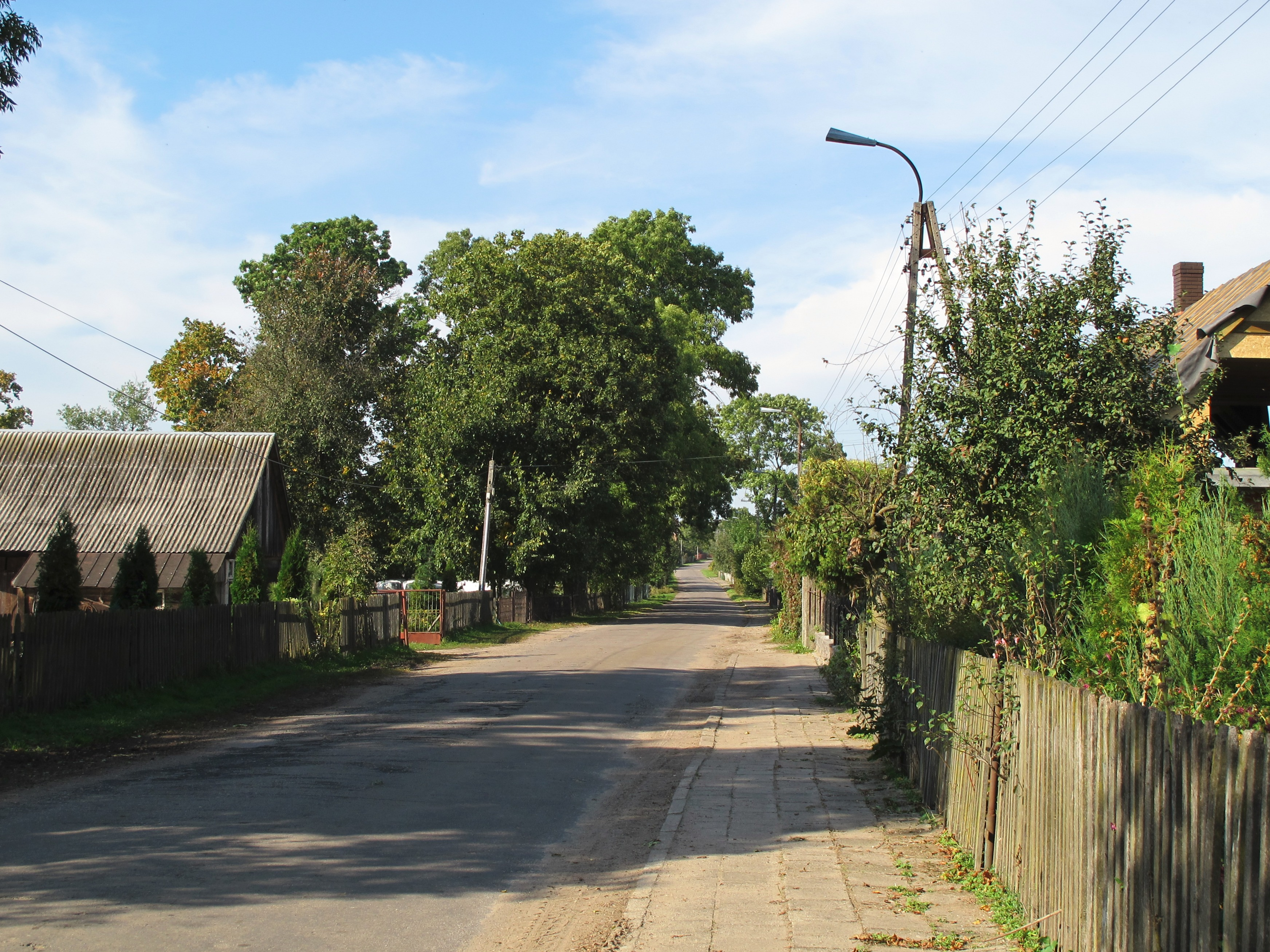

- Location within Poland
- Coordinates: 53°32′N 23°21′E
- Country: Poland
- Voivodeship: Podlaskie
- County: Sokółka
- Gmina: Sidra

Holiki [xɔˈliki] is a village in the administrative district of Gmina Sidra, within Sokółka County, Podlaskie Voivodeship, in north-eastern Poland.
