= Chorużowce =

- Village
- Location within Poland
- Coordinates: 53°43′N 23°34′E
- Country: Poland
- Voivodeship: Podlaskie
- County: Sokółka
- Gmina: Nowy Dwór
- Population: 280

Chorużowce [xɔruˈʐɔft͡sɛ] is a village in the administrative district of Gmina Nowy Dwór, within Sokółka County, Podlaskie Voivodeship, in north-eastern Poland, close to the border with Belarus.
