= Gmina Kuźnica =

Gmina Kuźnica Kuźnica Commune
- Gmina
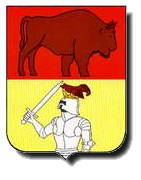
- Coat of arms

- Gmina Kuźnica within the Sokółka County
- Coordinates (Kuźnica): 53°30′35″N 23°38′37″E
- Country: Poland
- Voivodeship: Podlaskie
- County: Sokółka
- Seat: Kuźnica

Area
  - Total: 133.41 km^{2} (51.51 sq mi)

Population (2006)
  - Total: 4,277
  - Density: 32.06/km^{2} (83.03/sq mi)

Gmina Kuźnica is a rural gmina (administrative district) in Sokółka County, Podlaskie Voivodeship, in north-eastern Poland, on the border with Belarus. Its seat is the village of Kuźnica, which lies approximately 16 kilometres (10 mi) north-east of Sokółka and 54 km (34 mi) north-east of the regional capital Białystok.

The gmina covers an area of 133.41 square kilometres (51.5 sq mi), and as of 2006 its total population is 4,277.

== Government ==
=== Settlements ===
Gmina Kuźnica contains 48 settlements, 31 of which are not part of another settlement.

Name	Type	SIMC
Achrymowce	village	0033092
Białobłockie	village	0033100
Bilminy	village	0033117
Palestyna (Note: Part of the village of Bilminy.)	colony	0033123
Chreptowce	village	0033130
Chreptowce (Note: Part of the village of Chreptowce.)	colony	0033146
Gładowszczyzna	colony	0033152
Cimanie	village	0033169
Czepiele	village	0033175
Kryski (Note: Part of the village of Czepiele.)	hamlet	0033181
Tołoczki Małe	colony	0033198
Czuprynowo	village	0033206
Ułeczki (Note: Part of the village of Czuprynowo.)	colony	0033212
Długosielce	village	0033229
Klimówka	village	0033235
Kowale	village	0033241
Kowale-Kolonia	colony	0033258
Kruglany	village	0033264
Kierkielewszczyzna (Note: Part of the village of Kruglany.)	colony	1012554
Łosośna Mała	colony	0033270
Kuścińce	village	0033287
Kuźnica	village	0033293
Litwinki	village	0033301
Adamowo (Note: Part of the village of Litwinki.)	part	0033318
Pawłowicze	colony	0033324

Name	Type	SIMC
Łosośna Wielka	village	0033330
Łowczyki	village	0033347
Mieleszkowce Pawłowickie	village	0033353
Mieleszkowce Zalesiańskie	village	0033360
Milenkowce	village	0033376
Sterpejki (Note: Part of the village of Milenkowce.)	colony	0033382
Zajzdra	colony	0033399
Nowodziel	village	0033407
Szalciny (Note: Part of the village of Nowodziel.)	colony	0033413
Parczowce	village	0033420
Tołoczki Wielkie (Note: Part of the village of Parczowce.)	colony	0033436
Popławce	village	0033442
Saczkowce	village	0033459
Starowlany	village	0033465
Szymaki	village	0033471
Tołcze	village	0033488
Wojnowce	village	0033494
Auls (Note: Part of the village of Wojnowce.)	colony	
Wołkusze	village	0033519
Wołyńce	village	0033525
Dubnica Kurpiowska (Note: Part of the village of Wołyńce.)	colony	0033531
Wyzgi	village	0033548
Kuścin (Note: Part of the village of Wyzgi.)	colony	0033554

=== Sołectwa ===
Gmina Dąbrowa Białostocka is divided into 30 sołectwa.

Name	Sołtys
Achrymowce	Bartłomiej Burak
Białobłockie	Maria Baran
Bilminy	Bogusław Bilmin
Chreptowce	Mariusz Korycki
Cimanie	Krystyna Witulska
Czepiele	Marta Kowalewska
Czuprynowo	Agata Kieda
Długosielce	Mikołaj Sujeta
Klimówka	Adam Pużuk
Kowale	Iwona Pacuk
Kowale Kolonia	Elżbieta Krawiel
Kruglany	Katarzyna Siemieńczuk
Kuścińce	Agnieszka Dziemian
Kuźnica	Jadwiga Szymczukiewicz
Litwinki	Marian Kieda

Name	Sołtys
Łosośna Wielka	Paweł Sawoń
Łowczyki	Krzysztof Olszewski
Mieleszkowce Pawłowickie	Romuald Borys
Mieleszkowce Zalesiańskie	Ludmiła Natunewicz
Milenkowce	Kamil Białobłocki
Nowodziel	Jarosław Fiedorczyk
Parczowce	Marta Kułakowska
Popławce	Lucyna Lenkiewicz
Saczkowce	Wacława Kocisz
Starowlany	Piotr Samojlik
Tołcze	Jerzy Horczak
Wojnowce	Marianna Kocisz
Wołkusze	Małgorzata Potapczyk
Wołyńce	Stanisław Wołyniec
Wyzgi	Jan Malczyk

== Neighbouring gminas ==
Gmina Kuźnica is bordered by the gminas of Nowy Dwór, Sidra and Sokółka. It also borders Belarus.
