= Majewo Kościelne =

- Village
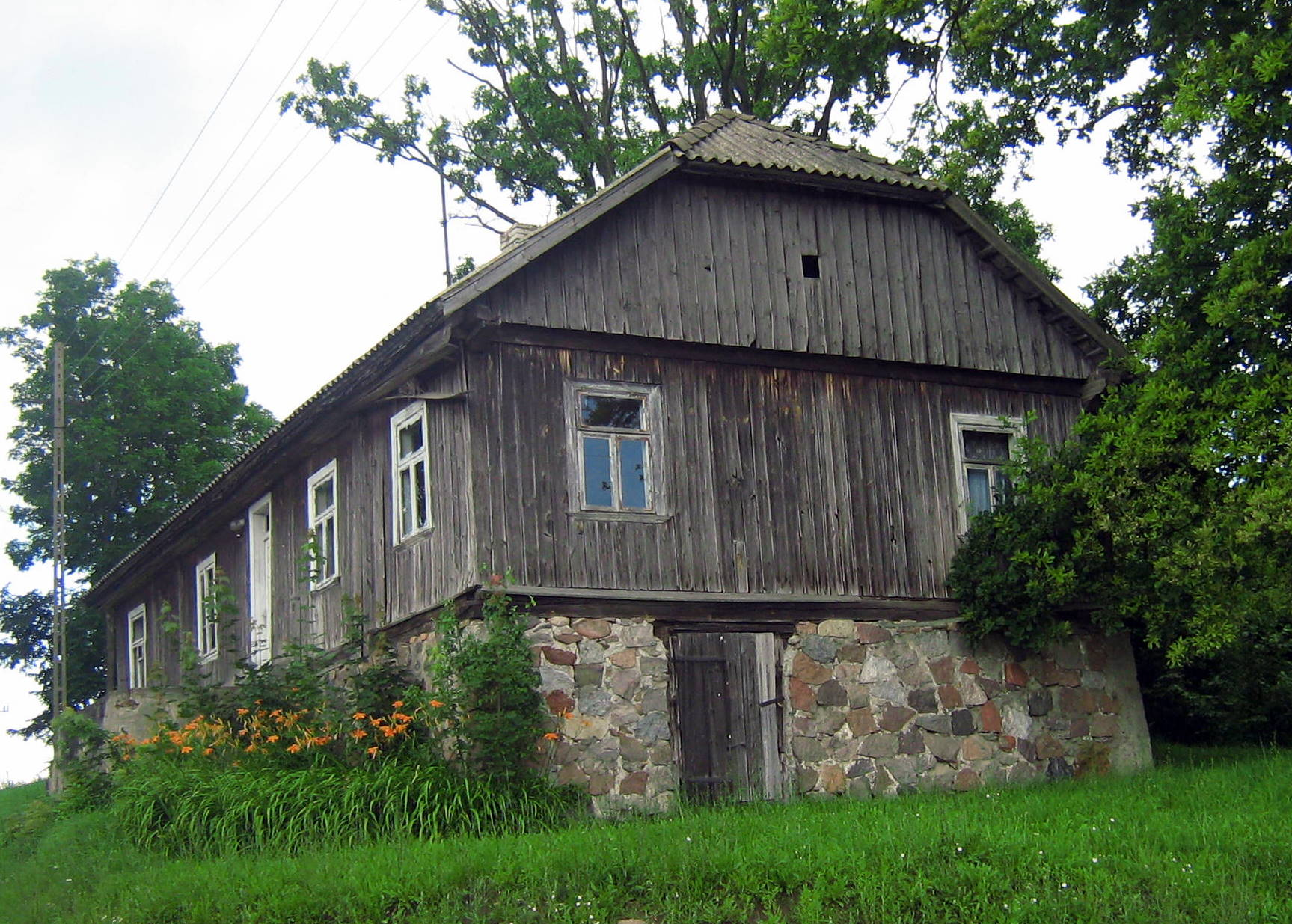
- A cottage in Majewo Kościelny.

- Location within Poland
- Coordinates: 53°30′10″N 23°20′43″E
- Country: Poland
- Voivodeship: Podlaskie
- County: Sokółka
- Gmina: Sidra

Majewo Kościelne [maˈjɛvɔ kɔɕˈt͡ɕɛlnɛ] is a village in the administrative district of Gmina Sidra, within Sokółka County, Podlaskie Voivodeship, in north-eastern Poland.
