= Putnowce =

- Village
- Location within Poland
- Coordinates: 53°31′01″N 23°28′01″E
- Country: Poland
- Voivodeship: Podlaskie
- County: Sokółka
- Gmina: Sidra

Putnowce [putˈnɔft͡sɛ] is a village in the administrative district of Gmina Sidra, within Sokółka County, Podlaskie Voivodeship, in north-eastern Poland.
