= Romanówka, Sokółka County =

Romanówka
- Village
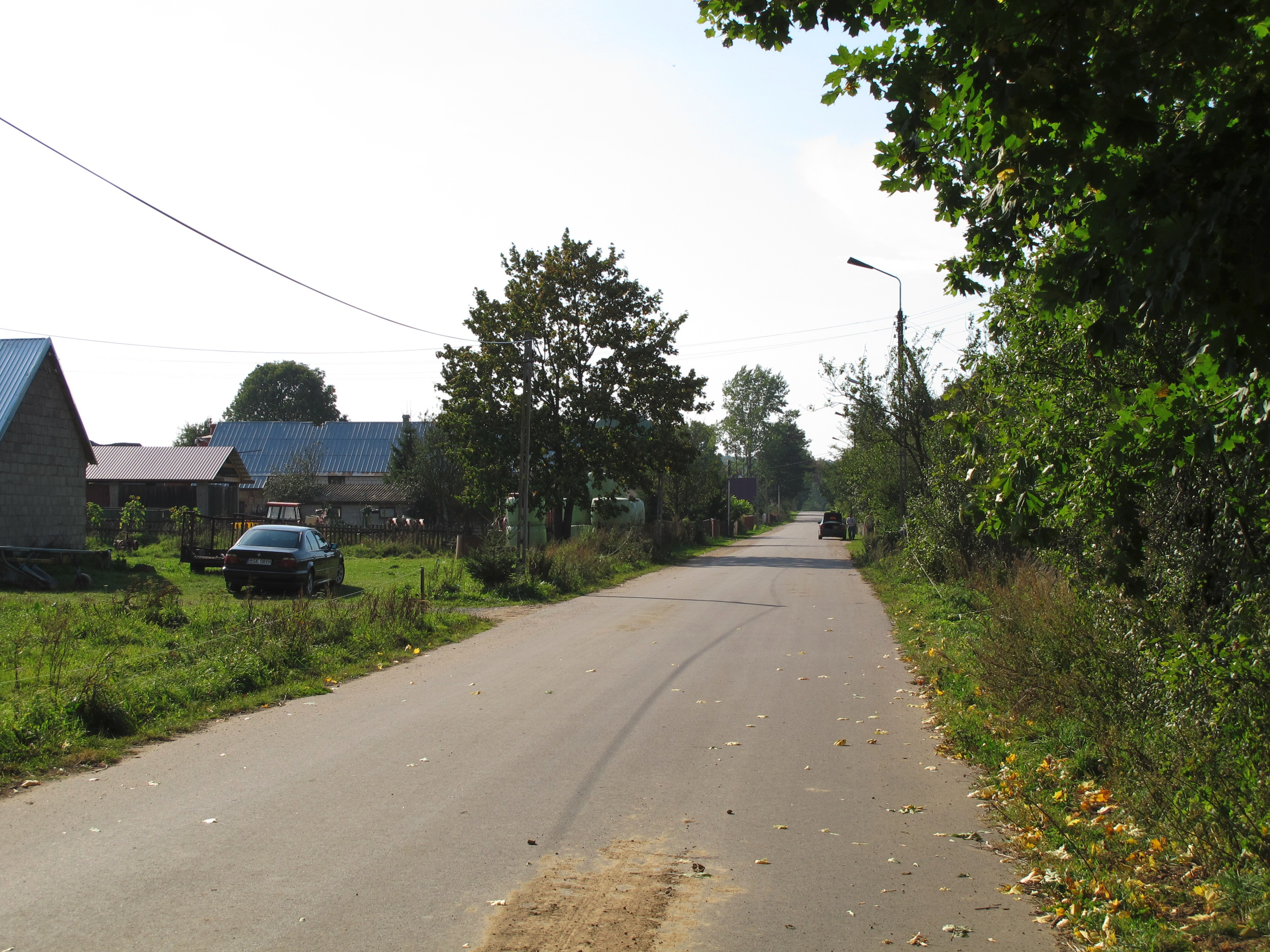

- Location within Poland
- Coordinates: 53°33′N 23°21′E
- Country: Poland
- Voivodeship: Podlaskie
- County: Sokółka
- Gmina: Sidra
- Time zone: UTC+1 (CET)
  - Summer (DST): UTC+2 (CEST)

Romanówka [rɔmaˈnufka] is a village in the administrative district of Gmina Sidra, within Sokółka County, Podlaskie Voivodeship, in north-eastern Poland.

== History ==
Three Polish citizens were murdered by Nazi Germany in the village during World War II.
