= Andrzejewo, Sokółka County =

Andrzejewo
- Village
- Location within Poland
- Coordinates: 53°32′34″N 23°30′16″E
- Country: Poland
- Voivodeship: Podlaskie
- County: Sokółka
- Gmina: Sidra

Andrzejewo ([andʐɛˈjɛvɔ]; Lithuanian: Andrejavas) is a village in the administrative district of Gmina Sidra, within Sokółka County, Podlaskie Voivodeship, in north-eastern Poland.

== Sources ==
- VLKK (2002). "Atvirkštinis lietuvių kalboje vartojamų tradicinių Lenkijos vietovardžių formų sąrašas" (PDF). VLKK (in Lithuanian).
