= Łowczyki =

Village in Gmina Kuźnica, Poland

- Village
- Location within Poland
- Coordinates: 53°29′46″N 23°33′17″E
- Country: Poland
- Voivodeship: Podlaskie
- County: Sokółka
- Gmina: Kuźnica

Łowczyki [wɔfˈt͡ʂɨki] is a village in the administrative district of Gmina Kuźnica, within Sokółka County, Podlaskie Voivodeship, in north-eastern Poland, close to the border with Belarus.
