= Tołcze, Sokółka County =

Tołcze
- Village
- Location within Poland
- Coordinates: 53°27′36″N 23°41′30″E
- Country: Poland
- Voivodeship: Podlaskie
- County: Sokółka
- Gmina: Kuźnica

Tołcze [ˈtɔu̯t͡ʂɛ] is a village in the administrative district of Gmina Kuźnica, within Sokółka County, Podlaskie Voivodeship, in north-eastern Poland, close to the border with Belarus.
