= Czuprynowo =

- Village
- Location within Poland
- Coordinates: 53°28′27″N 23°38′01″E
- Country: Poland
- Voivodeship: Podlaskie
- County: Sokółka
- Gmina: Kuźnica

Czuprynowo [t͡ʂuprɨˈnɔvɔ] is a village in the administrative district of Gmina Kuźnica, within Sokółka County, Podlaskie Voivodeship, in north-eastern Poland, close to the border with Belarus.
