= Łosośna Wielka =

- Village
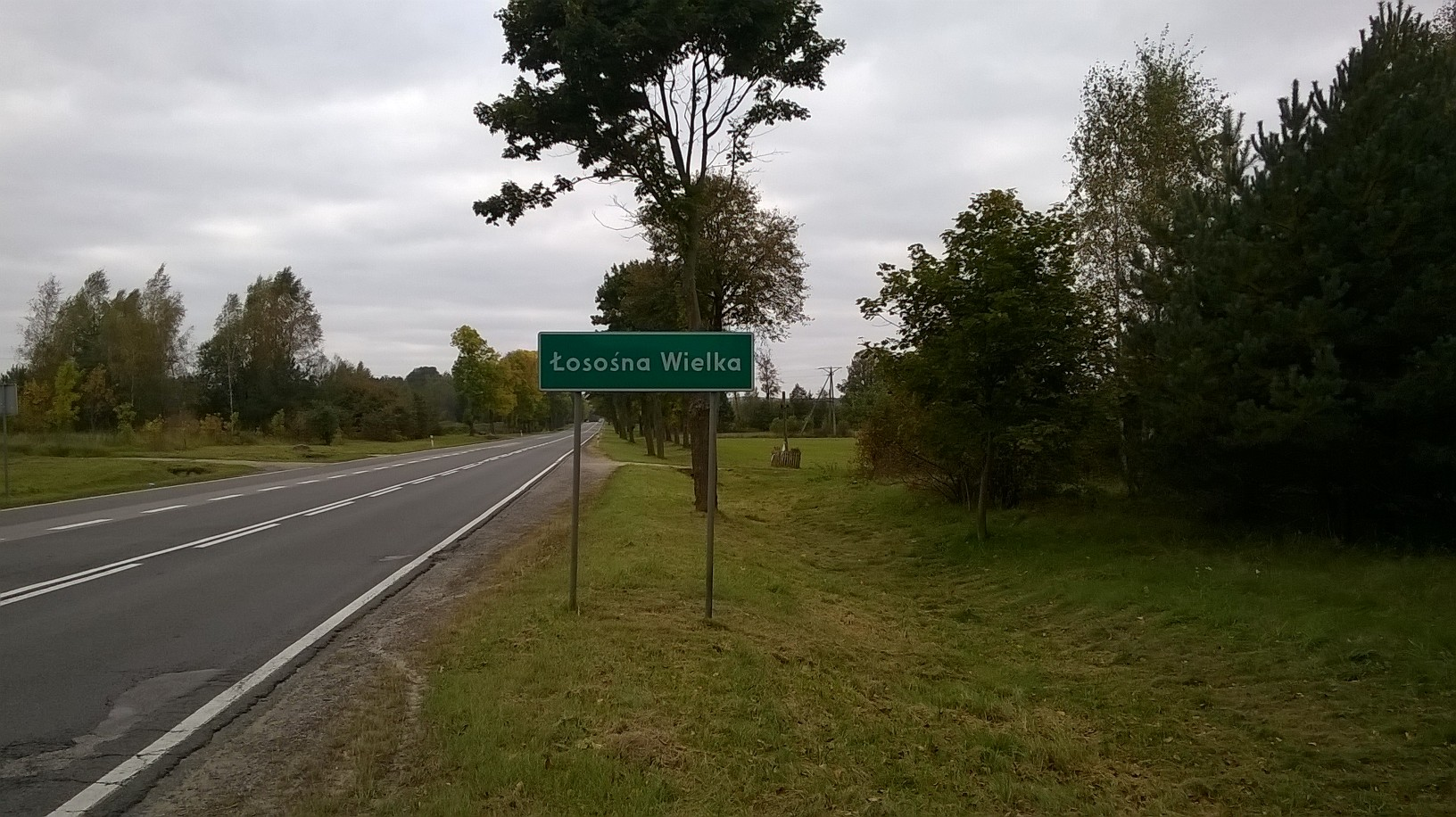
- Road sign leading to village of Łosośna Wielka

- Location within Poland
- Coordinates: 53°28′10″N 23°37′23″E
- Country: Poland
- Voivodeship: Podlaskie
- County: Sokółka
- Gmina: Kuźnica

Łosośna Wielka [wɔˈsɔɕna ˈvjɛlka] is a village in the administrative district of Gmina Kuźnica, within Sokółka County, Podlaskie Voivodeship, in north-eastern Poland, close to the border with Belarus.
