= Krzysztoforowo =

- Village
- Location within Poland
- Coordinates: 53°35′13″N 23°34′22″E
- Country: Poland
- Voivodeship: Podlaskie
- County: Sokółka
- Gmina: Sidra

Krzysztoforowo [kʂɨʂtɔfɔˈrɔvɔ] is a village in the administrative district of Gmina Sidra, within Sokółka County, Podlaskie Voivodeship, in northeastern Poland.
