= Mieleszkowce Zalesiańskie =

- Village
- Location within Poland
- Coordinates: 53°31′01″N 23°34′01″E
- Country: Poland
- Voivodeship: Podlaskie
- County: Sokółka
- Gmina: Kuźnica
- Population: 57

Mieleszkowce Zalesiańskie [mjɛlɛʂˈkɔft͡sɛ zalɛˈɕaɲskʲɛ] is a village in the administrative district of Gmina Kuźnica, within Sokółka County, Podlaskie Voivodeship, in north-eastern Poland, close to the border with Belarus.
