= Bieniowce-Kolonia =

- Village
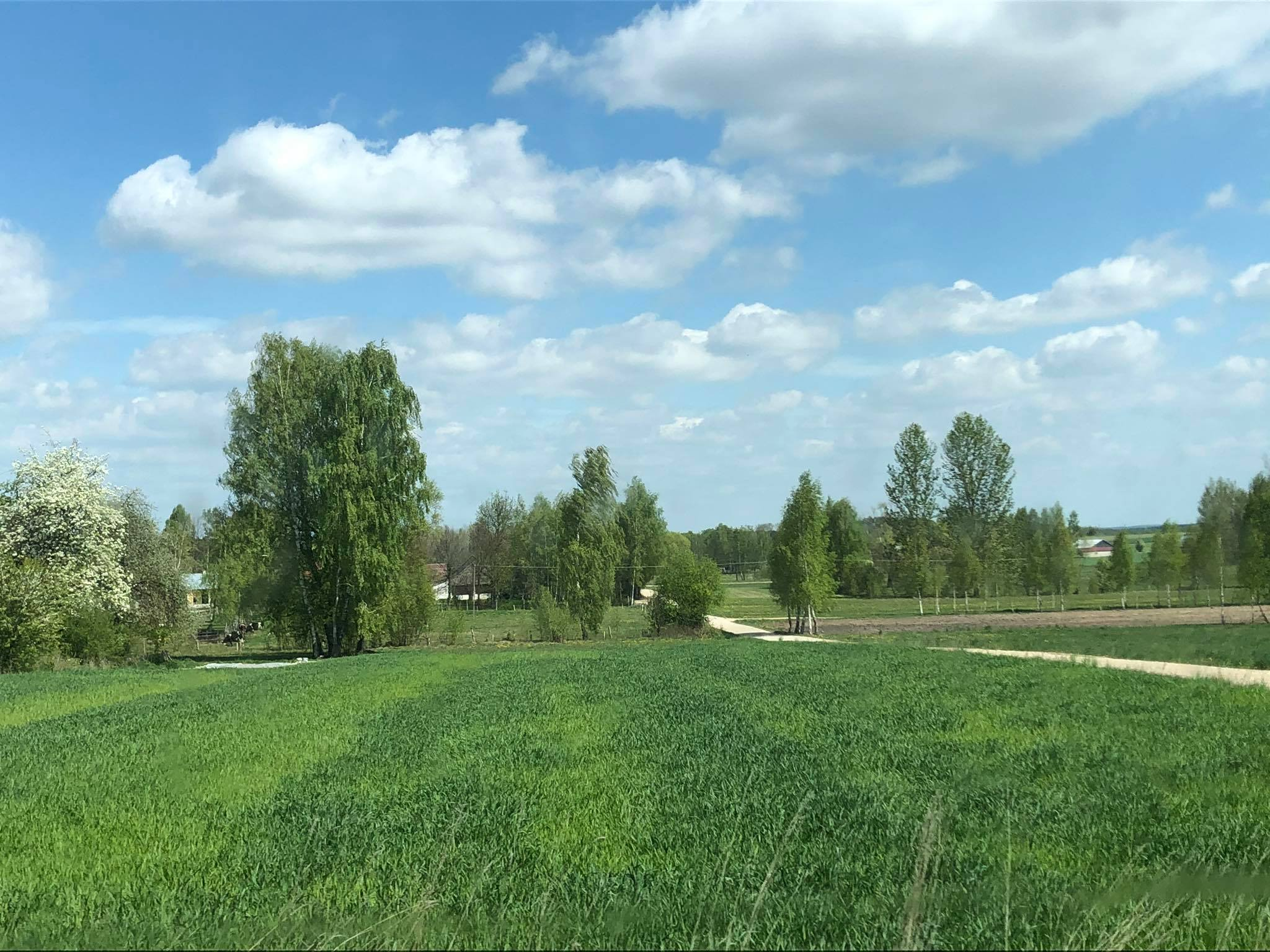
- Bieniowce-Kolonia

- Location within Poland
- Coordinates: 53°38′12″N 23°30′31″E
- Country: Poland
- Voivodeship: Podlaskie
- County: Sokółka
- Gmina: Nowy Dwór

Bieniowce-Kolonia [bjɛˈɲɔft͡sɛ kɔˈlɔɲa] is a village in the administrative district of Gmina Nowy Dwór, within Sokółka County, Podlaskie Voivodeship, in north-eastern Poland, close to the border with Belarus.
