= Wólka, Gmina Sidra =

Wólka
- Settlement
- Location within Poland
- Coordinates: 53°33′06″N 23°25′06″E
- Country: Poland
- Voivodeship: Podlaskie
- County: Sokółka
- Gmina: Sidra

Wólka [ˈvulka] is a settlement in the administrative district of Gmina Sidra, within Sokółka County, Podlaskie Voivodeship, in north-eastern Poland.
