= Zelwa, Sokółka County =

Zelwa
- Settlement
- Location within Poland
- Coordinates: 53°33′09″N 23°25′09″E
- Country: Poland
- Voivodeship: Podlaskie
- County: Sokółka
- Gmina: Sidra

Zelwa [ˈzɛlva] is a settlement in the administrative district of Gmina Sidra, within Sokółka County, Podlaskie Voivodeship, in north-eastern Poland.
