= Kalinówka, Sokółka County =

Kalinówka
- Settlement
- Location within Poland
- Coordinates: 53°36′04″N 23°27′04″E
- Country: Poland
- Voivodeship: Podlaskie
- County: Sokółka
- Gmina: Sidra

Kalinówka [kaliˈnufka] is a settlement in the administrative district of Gmina Sidra, within Sokółka County, Podlaskie Voivodeship, in north-eastern Poland.
