= Chreptowce =

- Village
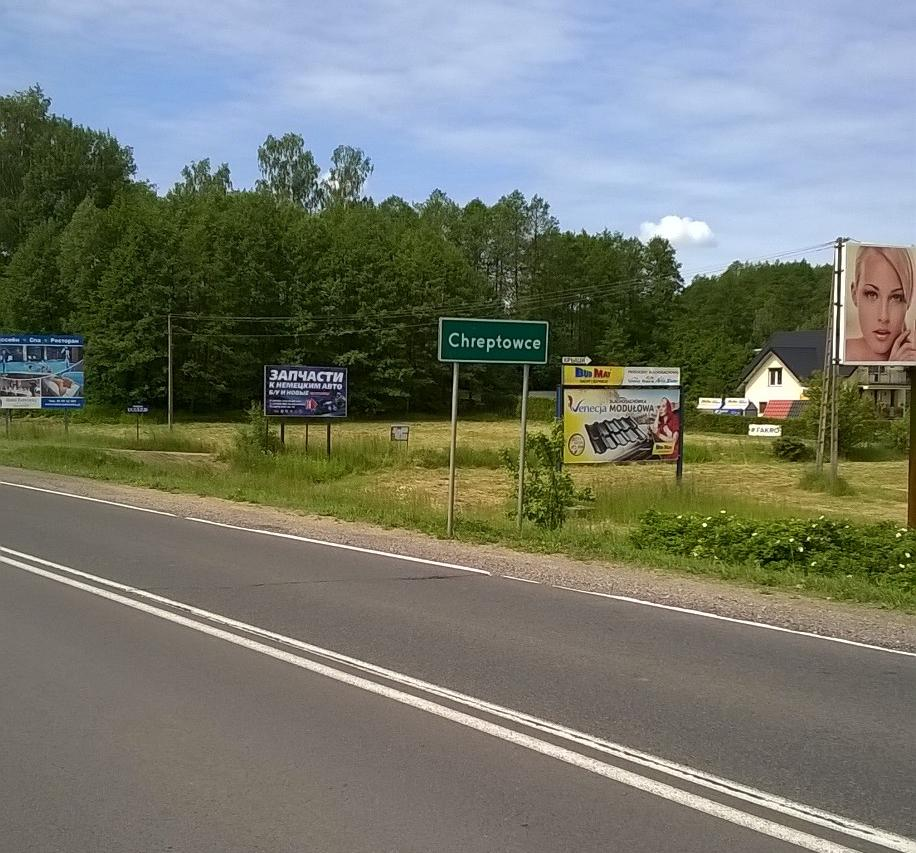
- Sign leading to the village of Chreptowce

- Location within Poland
- Coordinates: 53°29′54″N 23°38′14″E
- Country: Poland
- Voivodeship: Podlaskie
- County: Sokółka
- Gmina: Kuźnica

Chreptowce [xrɛpˈtɔft͡sɛ] is a village in the administrative district of Gmina Kuźnica, within Sokółka County, Podlaskie Voivodeship, in north-eastern Poland, close to the border with Belarus.
