= Chwojnowszczyzna =

- Settlement
- Location within Poland
- Coordinates: 53°39′12″N 23°32′15″E
- Country: Poland
- Voivodeship: Podlaskie
- County: Sokółka
- Gmina: Nowy Dwór

Chwojnowszczyzna [xfɔi̯nɔfʂˈt͡ʂɨzna] is a settlement in the administrative district of Gmina Nowy Dwór, within Sokółka County, Podlaskie Voivodeship, in north-eastern Poland, close to the border with Belarus.
