= Podsutki =

- Village
- Location within Poland
- Coordinates: 53°35′N 23°30′E
- Country: Poland
- Voivodeship: Podlaskie
- County: Sokółka
- Gmina: Sidra

Podsutki [pɔtˈsutki] is a village in the administrative district of Gmina Sidra, within Sokółka County, Podlaskie Voivodeship, in north-eastern Poland.
