= Plebanowce, Gmina Nowy Dwór =

Village in Gmina Nowy Dwór, Poland

Plebanowce
- Village
- Location within Poland
- Coordinates: 53°42′01″N 23°29′01″E
- Country: Poland
- Voivodeship: Podlaskie
- County: Sokółka
- Gmina: Nowy Dwór
- Population: 23

Plebanowce [plɛbaˈnɔft͡sɛ] is a village in the administrative district of Gmina Nowy Dwór, within Sokółka County, Podlaskie Voivodeship, in north-eastern Poland, close to the border with Belarus.
