= Klatka, Podlaskie Voivodeship =

Klatka
- Settlement
- Location within Poland
- Coordinates: 53°36′06″N 23°27′06″E
- Country: Poland
- Voivodeship: Podlaskie
- County: Sokółka
- Gmina: Sidra

Klatka [ˈklatka] is a settlement in the administrative district of Gmina Sidra, within Sokółka County, Podlaskie Voivodeship, in north-eastern Poland.
