= Siekierka, Podlaskie Voivodeship =

Siekierka
- Village
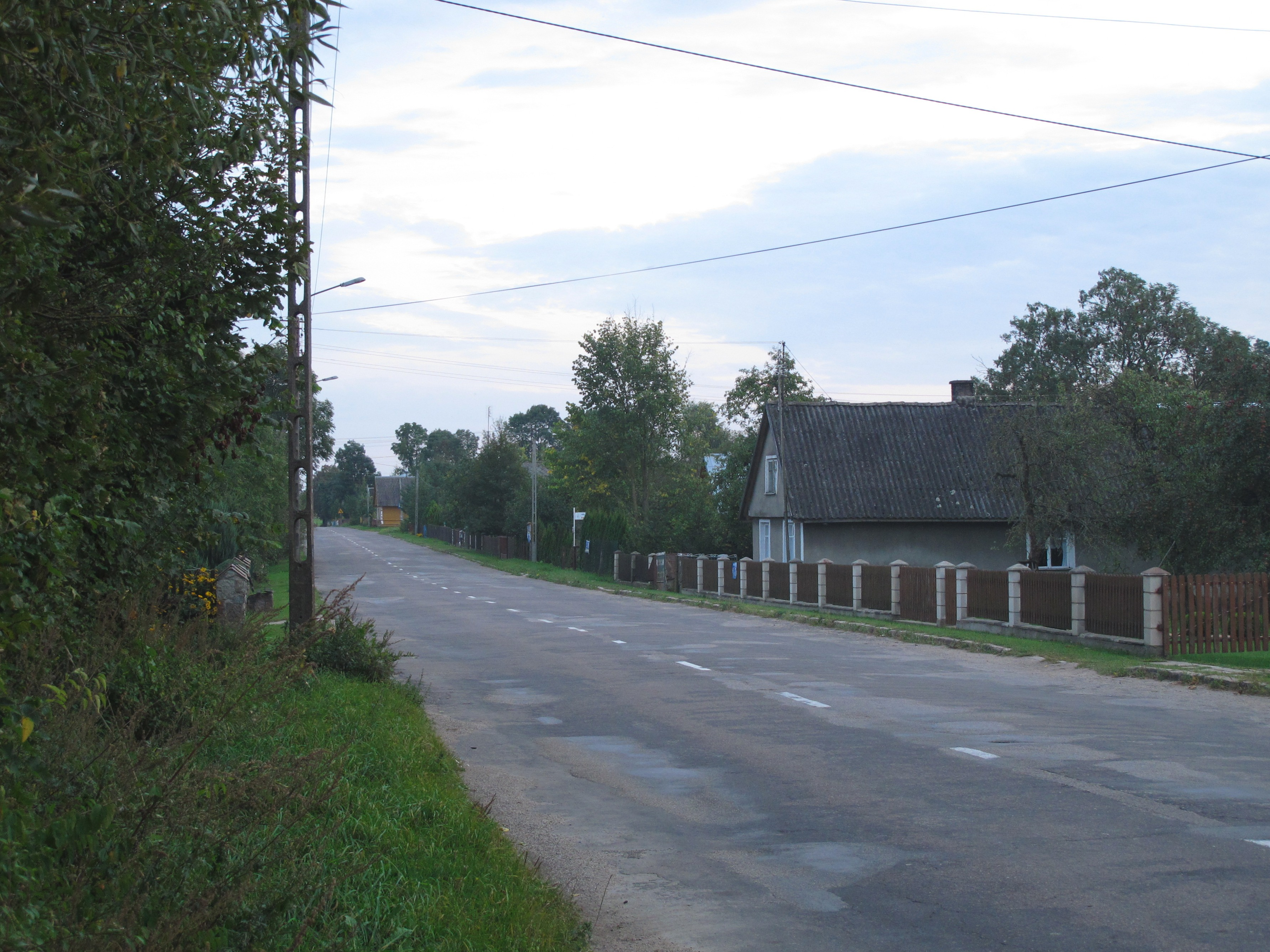

- Location within Poland
- Coordinates: 53°33′N 23°25′E
- Country: Poland
- Voivodeship: Podlaskie
- County: Sokółka
- Gmina: Sidra

Siekierka [ɕɛˈkʲɛrka] is a village in the administrative district of Gmina Sidra, within Sokółka County, Podlaskie Voivodeship, in north-eastern Poland.
