= Zwierżany =

- Village
- Location within Poland
- Coordinates: 53°31′01″N 23°33′01″E
- Country: Poland
- Voivodeship: Podlaskie
- County: Sokółka
- Gmina: Sidra

Zwierżany [zvjɛrˈʐanɨ] is a village in the administrative district of Gmina Sidra, within Sokółka County, Podlaskie Voivodeship, in north-eastern Poland.
