= Śniczany =

Village in Gmina Sidra, Poland

- Village
- Location within Poland
- Coordinates: 53°33′04″N 23°25′04″E
- Country: Poland
- Voivodeship: Podlaskie
- County: Sokółka
- Gmina: Sidra

Śniczany [ɕniˈt͡ʂanɨ] is a village in the administrative district of Gmina Sidra, within Sokółka County, Podlaskie Voivodeship, in north-eastern Poland.
