= Jakowla =

- Village
- Location within Poland
- Coordinates: 53°32′32″N 23°27′10″E
- Country: Poland
- Voivodeship: Podlaskie
- County: Sokółka
- Gmina: Sidra

Jakowla [jaˈkɔvla] is a village in the administrative district of Gmina Sidra, within Sokółka County, Podlaskie Voivodeship, in north-eastern Poland.
