= Majewo, Podlaskie Voivodeship =

Majewo
- Settlement
- Location within Poland
- Coordinates: 53°36′09″N 23°27′09″E
- Country: Poland
- Voivodeship: Podlaskie
- County: Sokółka
- Gmina: Sidra

Majewo [maˈjɛvɔ] is a settlement in the administrative district of Gmina Sidra, within Sokółka County, Podlaskie Voivodeship, in north-eastern Poland.
