= Nowy Dwór, Sokółka County =

Nowy Dwór
- Village
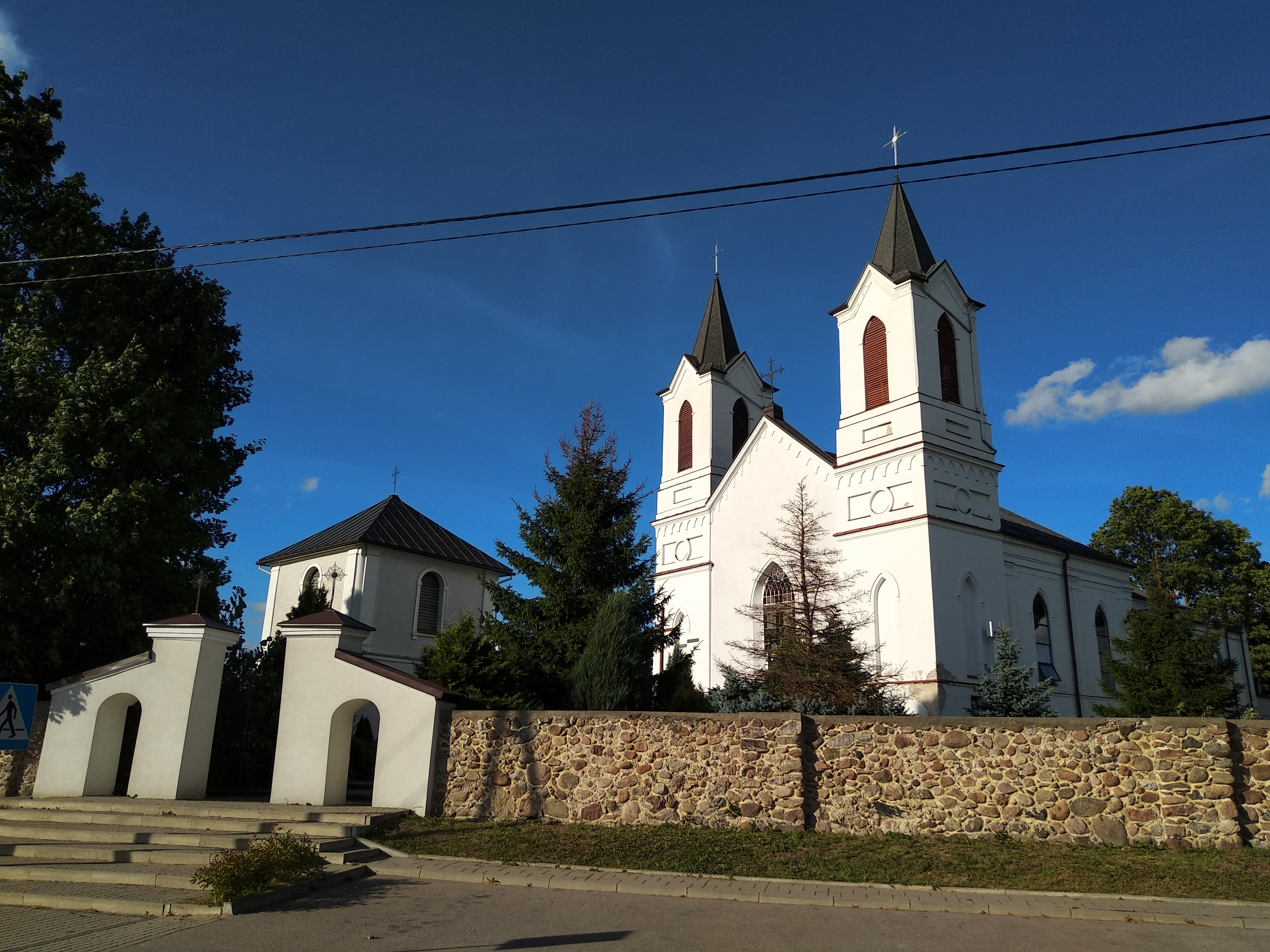
- Saint John the Baptist church in Nowy Dwór

- Location within Poland
- Coordinates: 53°38′N 23°33′E
- Country: Poland
- Voivodeship: Podlaskie
- County: Sokółka
- Gmina: Nowy Dwór
- Founded: 15th century

Population
  - Total: 830
- Time zone: UTC+1 (CET)
  - Summer (DST): UTC+2 (CEST)
- Postal code: 16-205
- Vehicle registration: BSK

Nowy Dwór [ˈnɔvɨ ˈdvur] is a village in Sokółka County, Podlaskie Voivodeship, in north-eastern Poland, close to the border with Belarus. It is the seat of the gmina (administrative district) called Gmina Nowy Dwór.

== History ==
The settlement was founded in the 15th century.

Four Polish citizens were murdered by Nazi Germany in the village during World War II.
