= Gmina Sidra =

Gmina Sidra Sidra Commune
- Gmina
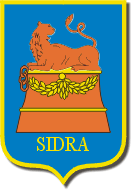
- Coat of arms

- Gmina Sidra within the Sokółka County
- Coordinates (Sidra): 53°33′11″N 23°26′55″E
- Country: Poland
- Voivodeship: Podlaskie
- County: Sokółka
- Seat: Sidra

Area
  - Total: 173.96 km^{2} (67.17 sq mi)

Population (2006)
  - Total: 3,916
  - Density: 22.51/km^{2} (58.30/sq mi)

Gmina Sidra is a rural gmina (administrative district) in Sokółka County, Podlaskie Voivodeship, in north-eastern Poland. Its seat is the village of Sidra, which lies approximately 18 kilometres (11 mi) north of Sokółka and 52 km (32 mi) north of the regional capital Białystok.

The gmina covers an area of 173.96 square kilometres (67.2 sq mi), and as of 2006 its total population is 3,916.

== Communities ==
=== Villages ===
- Andrzejewo
- Bieniasze
- Bierniki
- Bierwicha
- Chwaszczewo
- Dworzysk
- Gudebsk
- Holiki
- Jacowlany
- Jakowla
- Jałówka
- Jałówka-Kolonia
- Jurasze
- Kalwińszczyna
- Kniaziówka
- Krzysztoforowo
- Kurnatowszczyzna
- Ludomirowo
- Majewo Kościelne
- Makowlany
- Nowinka
- Ogrodniki
- Olchowniki
- Podsutki
- Poganica
- Pohorany
- Potrubowszczyzna
- Putnowce
- Racewo
- Romanówka
- Siderka
- Sidra
- Siekierka
- Słomianka
- Śniczany
- Staworowo
- Stefanowo
- Szczerbowo
- Szostaki
- Władysławowo
- Zalesie
- Zwierżany

=== Settlements ===
- Kalinówka
- Klatka
- Majewo
- Wandzin
- Wólka
- Zacisze
- Zelwa

== Neighbouring gminas ==
Gmina Sidra is bordered by the gminas of Dąbrowa Białostocka, Janów, Kuźnica, Nowy Dwór and Sokółka.
