= Siderka =

- Village
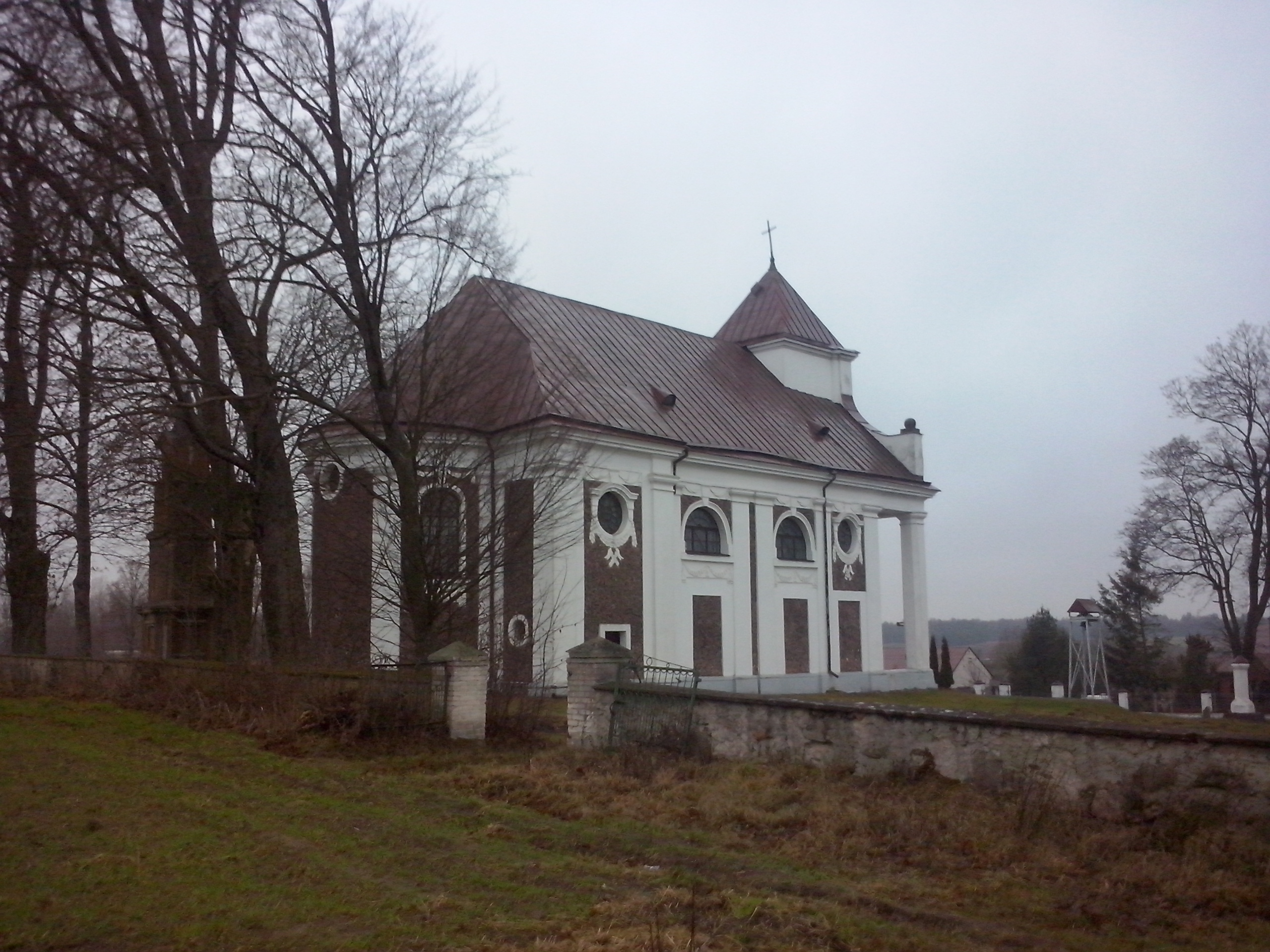
- Church in Siderka

- Location within Poland
- Coordinates: 53°35′35″N 23°27′33″E
- Country: Poland
- Voivodeship: Podlaskie
- County: Sokółka
- Gmina: Sidra

Siderka [ɕiˈdɛrka] is a village in the administrative district of Gmina Sidra, within Sokółka County, Podlaskie Voivodeship, in north-eastern Poland.
