= Kechallyar =

- Location within Azerbaijan
- Coordinates: 40°31′09″N 49°24′28″E
- Country: Azerbaijan
- Rayon: Khizi
- Time zone: UTC+4 (AZT)
  - Summer (DST): UTC+5 (AZT)

Kechallyar (also, Aul Kochalyar and Kachalar) is a village in the Khizi Rayon of Azerbaijan.
