= Rogozinski =

Rogozinski may refer to:

- Rogozinski (surname)
- Rogoziński Most, a settlement of Gmina Czarna Białostocka, within Białystok County, Poland
