= Aleksander Rybnik =

Officer of the Polish Army (1906–1946)

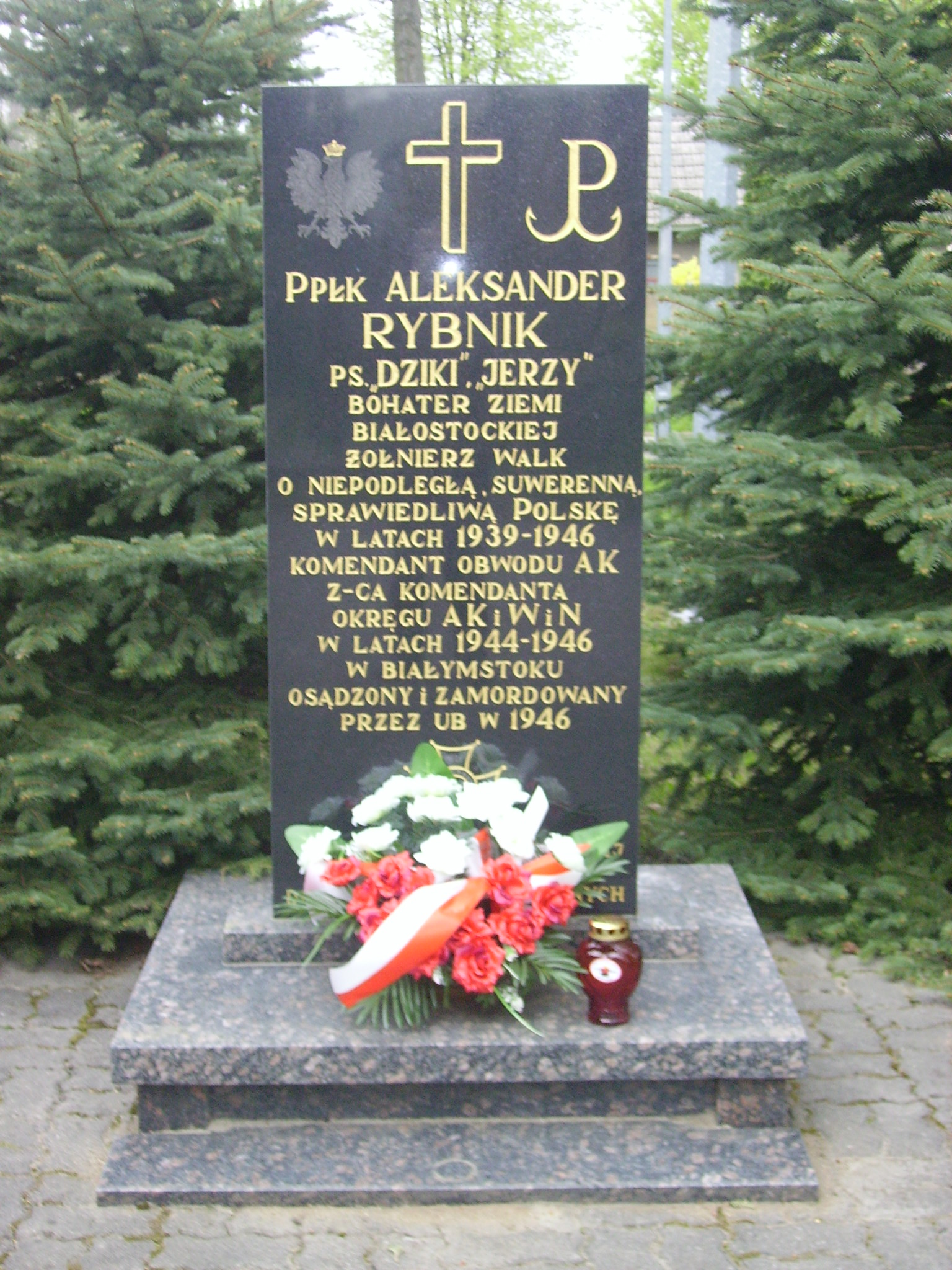
- Rybnik's symbolic grave
- Born: 13 December 1906; Starosielce, Białystok
- Died: 22 September 1946 (aged 39); Białystok Prison
- Military career
- Allegiance: Second Polish Republic
- Branch: Polish Army; Home Army
- Service years: 1927 - 1946
- Rank: Podpolkovnik
- Nicknames: "Aleksy", "Dziki", "Jerzy"
- Unit: KOP "Wołożin" battalion
- Commands: Białystok Home Army Inspectorate
- Conflicts: World War II

Aleksander Rybnik (born December 13, 1906, in Starosielce, died September 11, 1946, in Białystok) was infantry lieutenant colonel of the Polish Army of the Second Polish Republic and member of Home Army. Following the end of the war and the establishment of the Communist regime in Poland he was arrested and executed.

== Biography ==
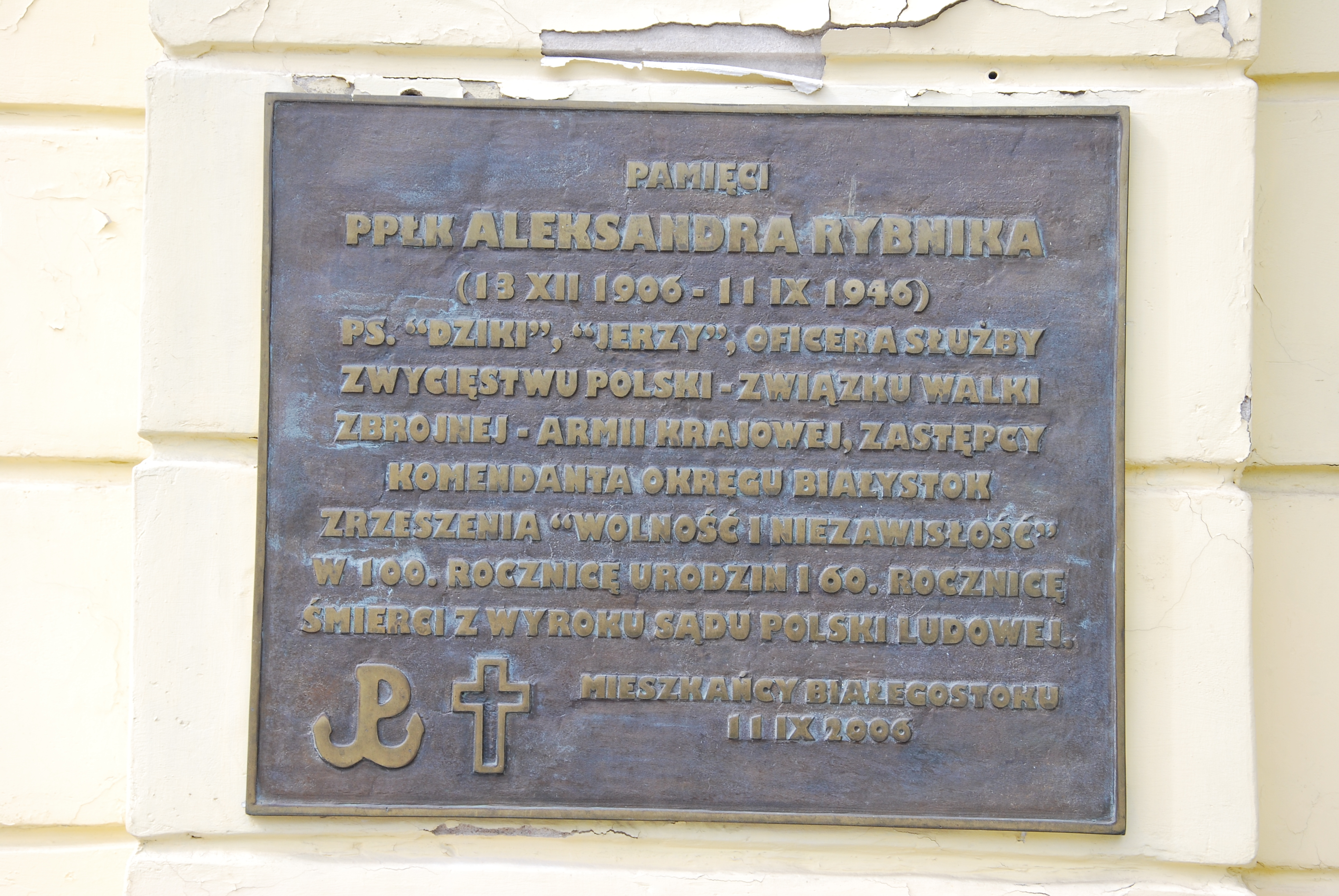
Plaque on the Kino Ton building in Kościuszko Square in Białystok where he was tried

In the years 1927-1930 he was a cadet at the Infantry Cadets School in Ostrów Mazowiecka. On August 15, 1930, he was appointed second lieutenant with seniority on August 15, 1930, and the 42nd place in the infantry officer corps and assigned to the 78th infantry regiment in Baranowicze. In the period from November 30, 1938, to March 20, 1939, he commanded the 4th rifle company of the KOP "Wołożin" battalion. He fought in the September Campaign of 1939 as the commander of an infantry company of the Border Protection Corps.

In April 1941, he became the commander of the Vilnius garrison. Arrested on April 12, he was to be deported to Siberia. He managed to escape from the railway transport on June 22, during the bombing of the railway station by the Germans. In the first days of 1942, he was appointed commander of the Slonim Home Army District. Threatened with arrest, in the second half of 1943 he took refuge in the German-occupied Białystok Voivodeship, where on December 10 he became the acting commander of the Białystok District, which was part of the Home Army's Białystok Region Inspectorate. From October 1944, he was commander of the Białystok Home Army Inspectorate.

On July 8, 1945, in the Knyszyn Forest, commanding the AKO "Piotrków" group, he fought a victorious battle near Ogóły with the 1st infantry regiment 1 Praski Pułk Piechoty of the 1st Tadeusz Kościuszko Infantry Division of the LWP and officers of the Department of Security supported by artillery and by the Soviets, with minimal own losses he avoided encirclement.

In October 1945, he was appointed Deputy President of the Białystok branch of Freedom and Independence Association organization. At the same time, he retained the position of inspector of Suwałki-Augustów and Białystok-Sokółki. He was arrested on April 19, 1946, in the village of Rybniki, by a group of the Polish Army pretending to be a branch of the National Military Union. Tried in the show trial of the Suwałki-Augustów Freedom and Independence Association Inspectorate (24 defendants), which took place in the hall of the Białystok "Ton" cinema on July 18–20, 1946. The trial was widely reported in the press. Rybnik and six subordinates were sentenced to death. The sentence was carried out on September 11, 1946, in the Białystok Prison. The place of burial remains unknown to this day.

On September 11, 2006, a plaque "In memory of Lt. Col. Aleksander Rybnik.

== See also ==
- Ludwik Kalkstein, Stalininst informant with Urzad Bezpieczenstwa
- Battle of Kuryłówka
- Augustów roundup (Polish: Obława augustowska)
- Attack on the NKVD Camp in Rembertów
- 1951 Mokotow Prison executions
- Raid on Kielce Prison
- Grey Ranks
