= Łazarz =

Łazarz may refer to:

- Łazarz, part of the district of Grunwald in Poznań, western Poland
- Łazarz, Podlaskie Voivodeship, a settlement in north-eastern Poland
