= Subdivisions of Podlaskie Voivodeship =

Podlaskie Voivodeship is divided into 17 counties (powiats): 3 city counties and 14 land counties. These are further divided into 118 gminas.

The counties are shown on the numbered map and detailed in the table beside it.

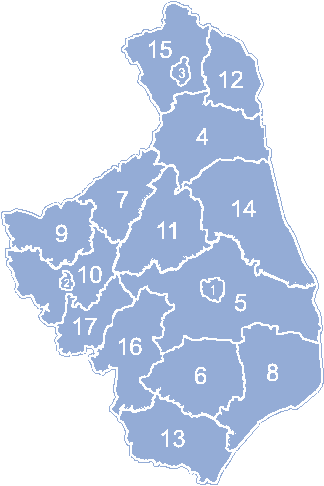
1. Białystok 2. Łomża 3. Suwałki 4. Augustów County 5. Białystok County 6. Bielsk County 7. Grajewo County 8. Hajnówka County 9. Kolno County 10. Łomża County 11. Mońki County 12. Sejny County 13. Siemiatycze County 14. Sokółka County 15. Suwałki County 16. Wysokie Mazowieckie County 17. Zambrów County

English and Polish names	Area (km^{2})	Population (2006)	Seat	Other towns	Total gminas
City counties
Białystok	102	295,210			1
Suwałki	65	69,234			1
Łomża	33	63,572			1
Land counties
Białystok County powiat białostocki	2,985	136,797	Białystok *	Łapy, Czarna Białostocka, Wasilków, Choroszcz, Supraśl, Michałowo, Zabłudów, Tykocin, Suraż	15
Sokółka County powiat sokólski	2,054	72,424	Sokółka	Dąbrowa Białostocka, Krynki, Suchowola	10
Bielsk County powiat bielski	1,385	60,047	Bielsk Podlaski	Brańsk	8
Wysokie Mazowieckie County powiat wysokomazowiecki	1,288	59,719	Wysokie Mazowieckie	Ciechanowiec, Szepietowo, Czyżew	10
Augustów County powiat augustowski	1,658	58,966	Augustów	Lipsk	7
Łomża County powiat łomżyński	1,354	50,887	Łomża *	Nowogród, Jedwabne	9
Grajewo County powiat grajewski	967	50,120	Grajewo	Szczuczyn, Rajgród	6
Siemiatycze County powiat siemiatycki	1,460	48,603	Siemiatycze	Drohiczyn	9
Hajnówka County powiat hajnowski	1,624	48,130	Hajnówka	Kleszczele	9
Zambrów County powiat zambrowski	733	44,798	Zambrów		5
Mońki County powiat moniecki	1,382	42,960	Mońki	Knyszyn, Goniądz	7
Kolno County powiat kolneński	940	39,676	Kolno	Stawiski	6
Suwałki County powiat suwalski	1,307	35,136	Suwałki *		9
Sejny County powiat sejneński	856	21,331	Sejny		5
* seat not part of the county
