= Horodnianka =

Horodnianka may refer to the following places:

- Horodnianka, Gmina Czarna Białostocka in Podlaskie Voivodeship (north-east Poland)
- Horodnianka, Gmina Wasilków in Podlaskie Voivodeship (north-east Poland)
- Horodnianka, Sokółka County in Podlaskie Voivodeship (north-east Poland)
