= Dworzysk =

Dworzysk may refer to the following places:

- Dworzysk, Białystok County in Podlaskie Voivodeship (north-east Poland)
- Dworzysk, Gmina Sokółka in Podlaskie Voivodeship (north-east Poland)
- Dworzysk, Gmina Sidra in Podlaskie Voivodeship (north-east Poland)
