= Złotoria =

Złotoria may refer to the following places:

- Złotoria, Kuyavian-Pomeranian Voivodeship (north-central Poland)
- Złotoria, Gmina Choroszcz in Podlaskie Voivodeship (north-east Poland)
- Złotoria, Gmina Czarna Białostocka in Podlaskie Voivodeship (north-east Poland)

== See also ==
- Złotoryja, Lower Silesian Voivodeship. Poland
