= Ponure =

- Village
- Location within Poland
- Coordinates: 53°15′42″N 23°17′21″E
- Country: Poland
- Voivodeship: Podlaskie
- County: Białystok
- Gmina: Czarna Białostocka

Ponure [pɔˈnurɛ] is a village in the administrative district of Gmina Czarna Białostocka, within Białystok County, Podlaskie Voivodeship, in north-eastern Poland.
