= Osiedle Młodych, Białystok =

Młodych
- District (osiedle) of Białystok
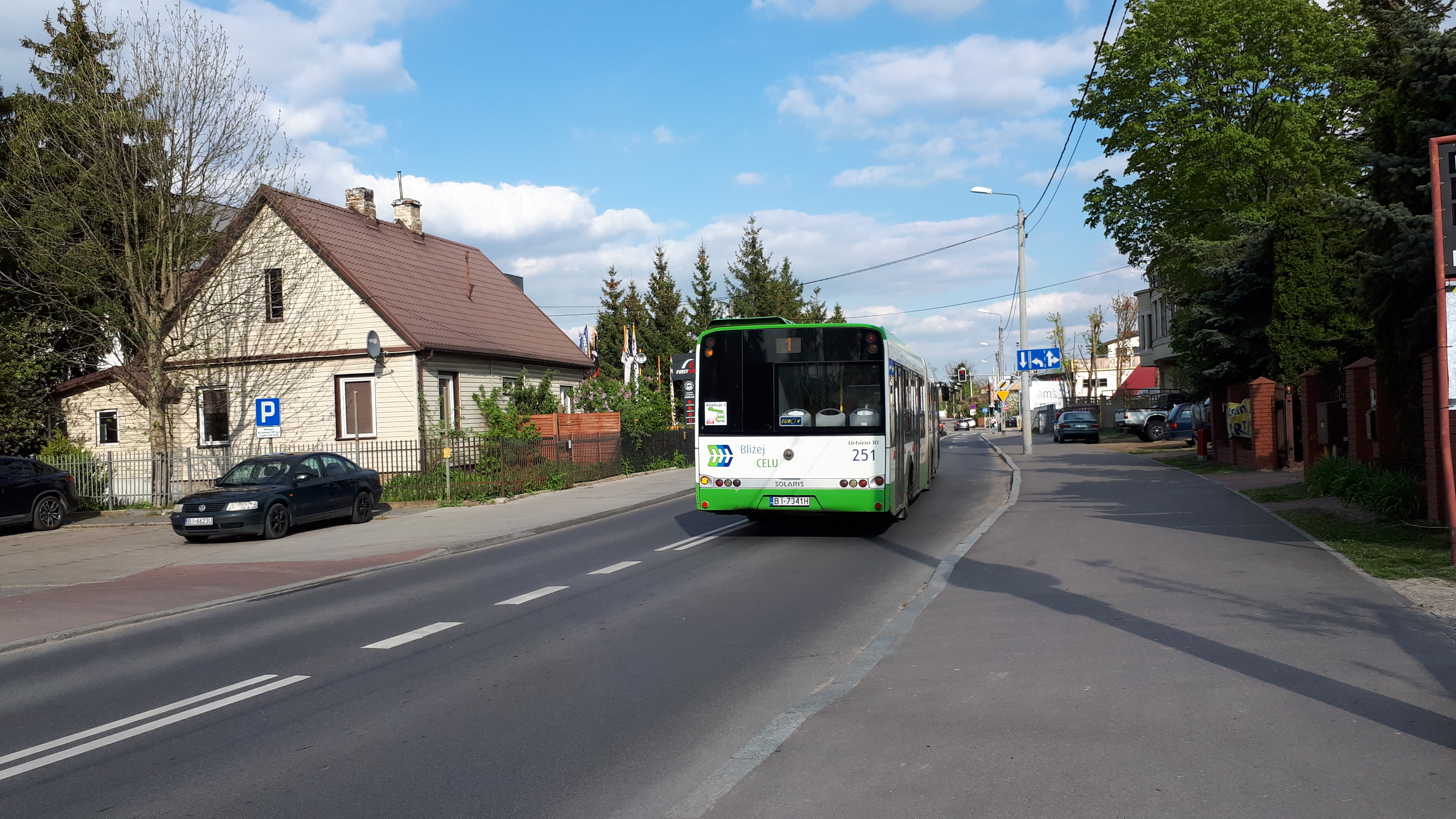
- Marczukowska Street in Młodych, May 2020

- Location of Młodych District within Białystok
- Coordinates: 53°08′02″N 23°07′15″E
- Country: Poland
- Voivodeship: Podlaskie
- City: Białystok

Area
  - Total: 1.766 km^{2} (0.682 sq mi)
- Time zone: UTC+1 (CET)
  - Summer (DST): UTC+2 (CEST)
- Area code: +48 85
- Vehicle registration: BI

"Osiedle Młodych" is also the name of the housing cooperative administering much of Rataje, Poznań.

Osiedle Młodych (meaning "Estate of the Young") is one of the districts of the Polish city of Białystok. The Białystok Prison is located at 89 Hetmańska street in the district.

== History ==
The Marczuk and Antoniuk farms were located in the district's territory. Following the end of the World War II and the establishment of the Polish People's Republic, a milk factory was established between Zwycięstwa and Gruntowa streets.
