= Niemczyn, Podlaskie Voivodeship =

Niemczyn
- Village
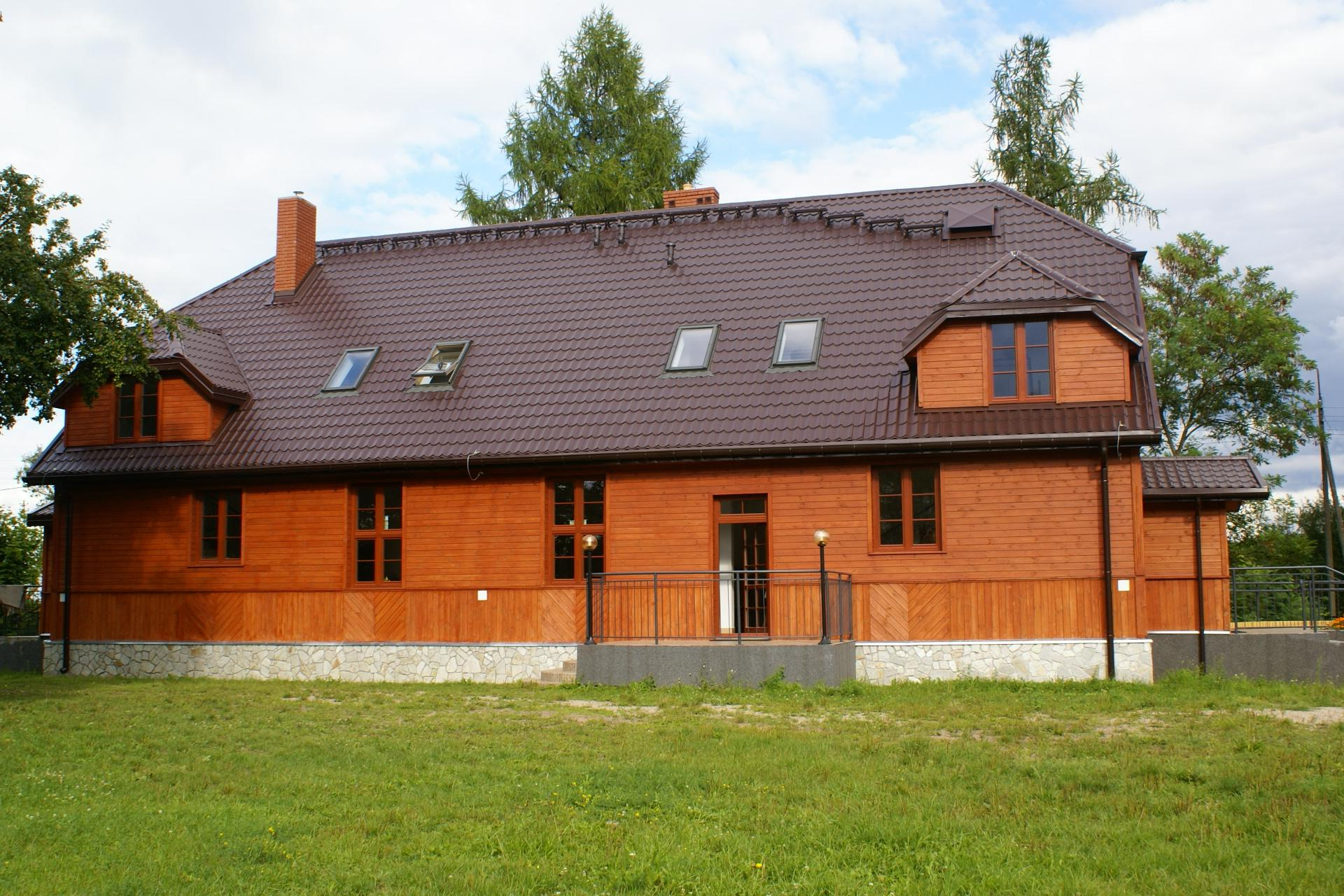

- Location within Poland
- Coordinates: 53°21′11″N 23°11′34″E
- Country: Poland
- Voivodeship: Podlaskie
- County: Białystok
- Gmina: Czarna Białostocka

Niemczyn [ˈɲɛmt͡ʂɨn] is a village in the administrative district of Gmina Czarna Białostocka, within Białystok County, Podlaskie Voivodeship, in north-eastern Poland.
