= Zamczysk, Białystok County =

Zamczysk
- Village
- Location within Poland
- Coordinates: 53°21′N 23°10′E
- Country: Poland
- Voivodeship: Podlaskie
- County: Białystok
- Gmina: Czarna Białostocka

Zamczysk [ˈzamt͡ʂɨsk] is a village in the administrative district of Gmina Czarna Białostocka, within Białystok County, Podlaskie Voivodeship, in north-eastern Poland.
