= Jezierzysk =

- Village
- Location within Poland
- Coordinates: 53°21′05″N 23°15′05″E
- Country: Poland
- Voivodeship: Podlaskie
- County: Białystok
- Gmina: Czarna Białostocka

Jezierzysk [jɛˈʑɛʐɨsk] is a village in the administrative district of Gmina Czarna Białostocka, within Białystok County, Podlaskie Voivodeship, in north-eastern Poland.
