= Złota Wieś =

- Village
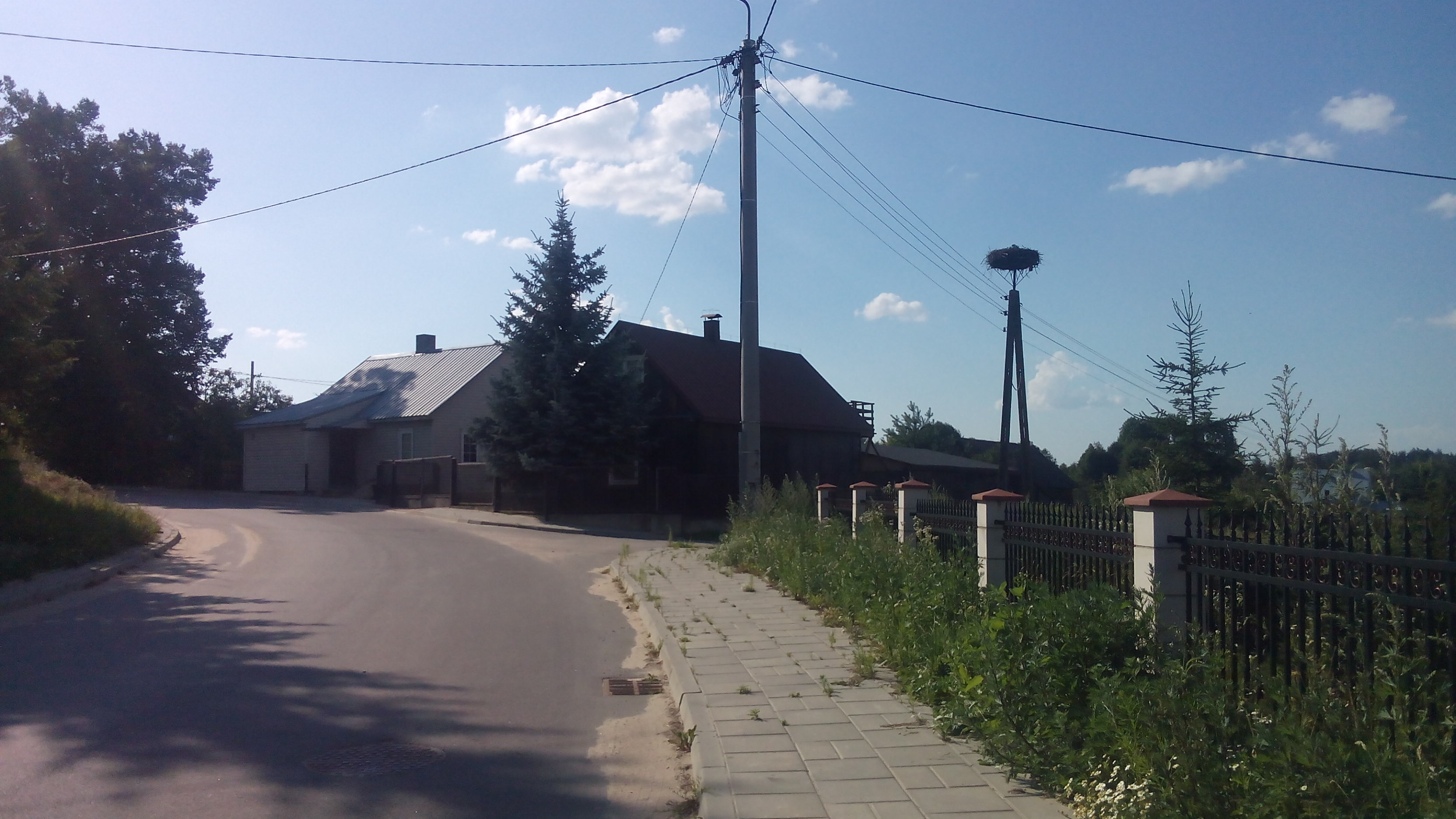

- Location within Poland
- Coordinates: 53°17′N 23°15′E
- Country: Poland
- Voivodeship: Podlaskie
- County: Białystok
- Gmina: Czarna Białostocka

Złota Wieś [ˈzwɔta ˈvjɛɕ] is a village in the administrative district of Gmina Czarna Białostocka, within Białystok County, Podlaskie Voivodeship, in north-eastern Poland.
