= Przewalanka =

- Village
- Location within Poland
- Coordinates: 53°19′30″N 23°7′23″E
- Country: Poland
- Voivodeship: Podlaskie
- County: Białystok
- Gmina: Czarna Białostocka

Przewalanka [pʂɛvaˈlaŋka] is a village in the administrative district of Gmina Czarna Białostocka, within Białystok County, Podlaskie Voivodeship, in north-eastern Poland.
