= Gmina Czarna Białostocka =

Gmina Czarna Białostocka Czarna Białostocka Commune
- Gmina
- Coat of arms

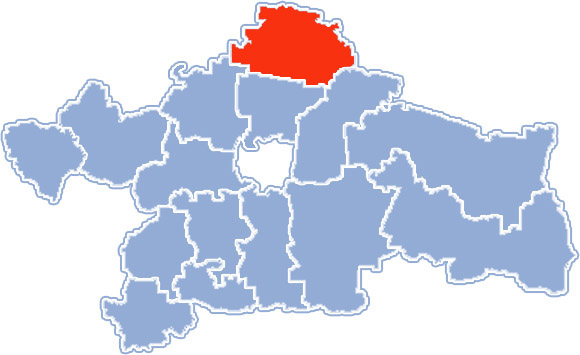
- Location within Białystok County
- Coordinates (Czarna Białostocka): 53°18′N 23°17′E
- Country: Poland
- Voivodeship: Podlaskie
- County: Białystok County
- Seat: Czarna Białostocka

Area
  - Total: 206.54 km^{2} (79.75 sq mi)

Population (2006)
  - Total: 11,692
  - Density: 56.609/km^{2} (146.62/sq mi)
  - Urban: 9,596
  - Rural: 2,096
- Time zone: UTC+1 (CET)
  - Summer (DST): UTC+2 (CEST)
- Website: http://www.czarnabialostocka.pl/

Gmina Czarna Białostocka is an urban-rural gmina (administrative district) in Białystok County, Podlaskie Voivodeship, in north-eastern Poland. Its seat is the town of Czarna Białostocka, which lies approximately 22 kilometres (14 mi) north of the regional capital Białystok.

The gmina covers an area of 206.54 square kilometres (79.7 sq mi), and as of 2006 its total population is 11,692 (out of which the population of Czarna Białostocka amounts to 9,596, and the population of the rural part of the gmina is 2,096).

The gmina contains part of the protected area called Knyszyń Forest Landscape Park.

== Villages ==
Apart from the town of Czarna Białostocka, Gmina Czarna Białostocka contains the villages and settlements of Brzozówka Koronna, Brzozówka Strzelecka, Brzozówka Ziemiańska, Budzisk, Burczak, Chmielnik, Czarna Wieś Kościelna, Czumażówka, Dworzysk, Horodnianka, Hutki, Jesienicha, Jezierzysk, Karczmisko, Klimki, Kosmaty Borek, Krzyżyki, Lacka Buda, Łapczyn, Łazarz, Machnacz, Niemczyn, Ogóły, Oleszkowo, Osierodek, Ośrodek, Podbrzozówka, Podratowiec, Podzamczysk, Ponure, Przewalanka, Ratowiec, Rogoziński Most, Ruda Rzeczka, Rudnia, Wilcza Jama, Wólka Ratowiecka, Zamczysk, Zdroje, Złota Wieś and Złotoria.

== Neighbouring gminas ==
Gmina Czarna Białostocka is bordered by the gminas of Dobrzyniewo Duże, Janów, Jasionówka, Knyszyn, Korycin, Sokółka, Supraśl and Wasilków.
