= Wilcza Jama, Białystok County =

Wilcza Jama
- Settlement
- Location within Poland
- Coordinates: 53°21′15″N 23°18′31″E
- Country: Poland
- Voivodeship: Podlaskie
- County: Białystok
- Gmina: Czarna Białostocka

Wilcza Jama [ˈvilt͡ʂa ˈjama] is a settlement in the administrative district of Gmina Czarna Białostocka, within Białystok County, Podlaskie Voivodeship, in north-eastern Poland.
