= Lacka Buda =

- Village
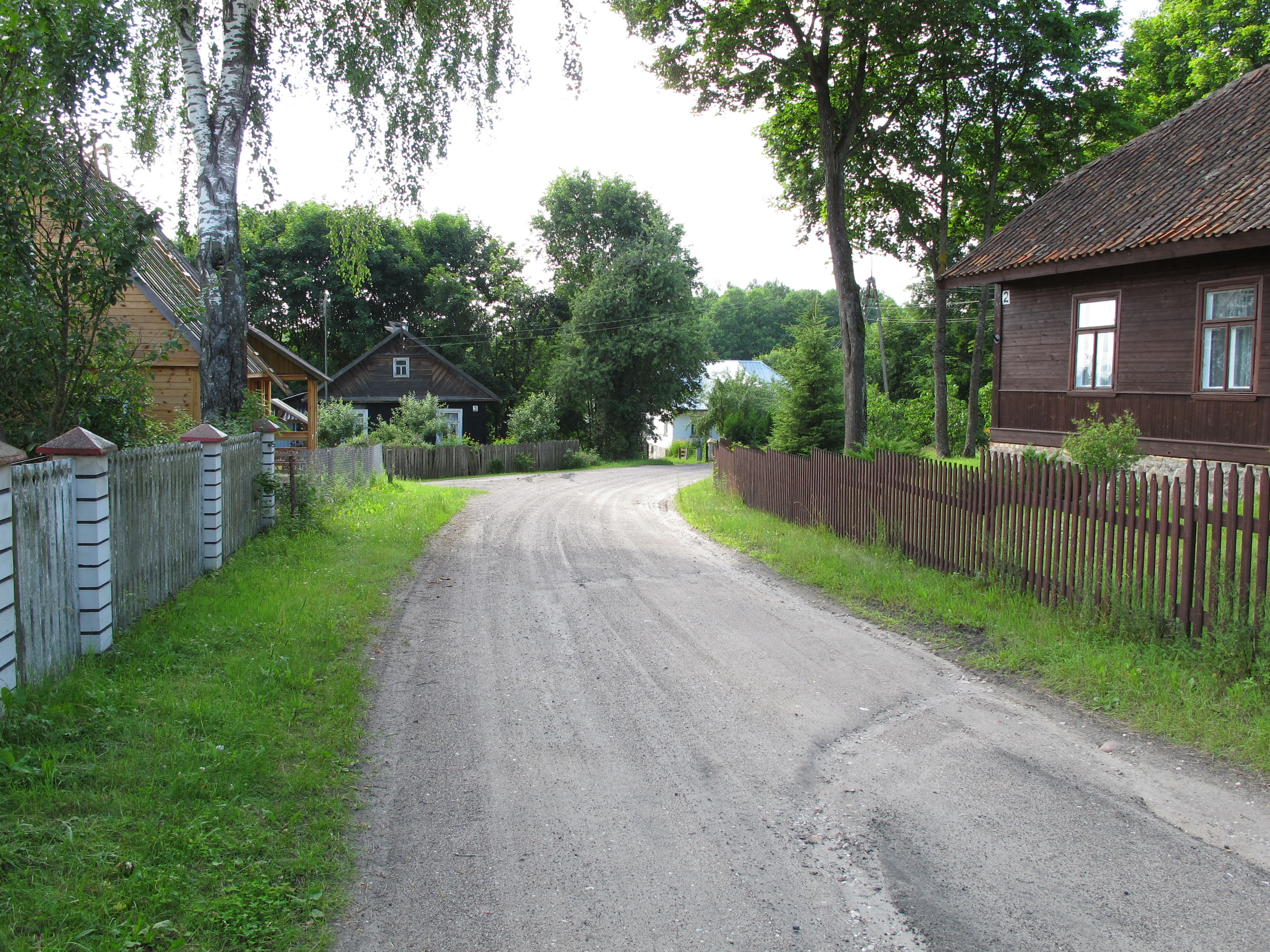

- Location within Poland
- Coordinates: 53°19′19″N 23°10′21″E
- Country: Poland
- Voivodeship: Podlaskie
- County: Białystok
- Gmina: Czarna Białostocka

Lacka Buda [ˈlat͡ska ˈbuda] is a village in the administrative district of Gmina Czarna Białostocka, within Białystok County, Podlaskie Voivodeship, in north-eastern Poland.
