= Machnacz, Podlaskie Voivodeship =

Machnacz
- Village
- Location within Poland
- Coordinates: 53°19′43″N 23°18′31″E
- Country: Poland
- Voivodeship: Podlaskie
- County: Białystok
- Gmina: Czarna Białostocka

Machnacz [ˈmaxnat͡ʂ] is a village in the administrative district of Gmina Czarna Białostocka, within Białystok County, Podlaskie Voivodeship, in north-eastern Poland.
