= Budzisk =

- Settlement
- Location within Poland
- Coordinates: 53°16′44″N 23°22′42″E
- Country: Poland
- Voivodeship: Podlaskie
- County: Białystok
- Gmina: Czarna Białostocka

Budzisk [ˈbud͡ʑisk] is a settlement in the administrative district of Gmina Czarna Białostocka, within Białystok County, Podlaskie Voivodeship, in north-eastern Poland.
