= Zdroje, Gmina Czarna Białostocka =

Zdroje
- Village
- Location within Poland
- Coordinates: 53°22′10″N 23°10′10″E
- Country: Poland
- Voivodeship: Podlaskie
- County: Białystok
- Gmina: Czarna Białostocka

Zdroje [ˈzdrɔjɛ] is a village in the administrative district of Gmina Czarna Białostocka, within Białystok County, Podlaskie Voivodeship, in north-eastern Poland.
