= Rogozinski (surname) =

Rogozinski or Rogoziński (feminine: Rogozińska; plural: Rogozińscy) is a Polish surname. Notable people with this surname include:

- Jacques Rogozinski (born 1950), Mexican economist and public official
- Maria Rogozińska (died 1943), Polish farmer and Righteous Among the Nations
- Stefan Szolc-Rogoziński (1861–1896), Polish explorer
