= Czarna Wieś Kościelna =

- Village
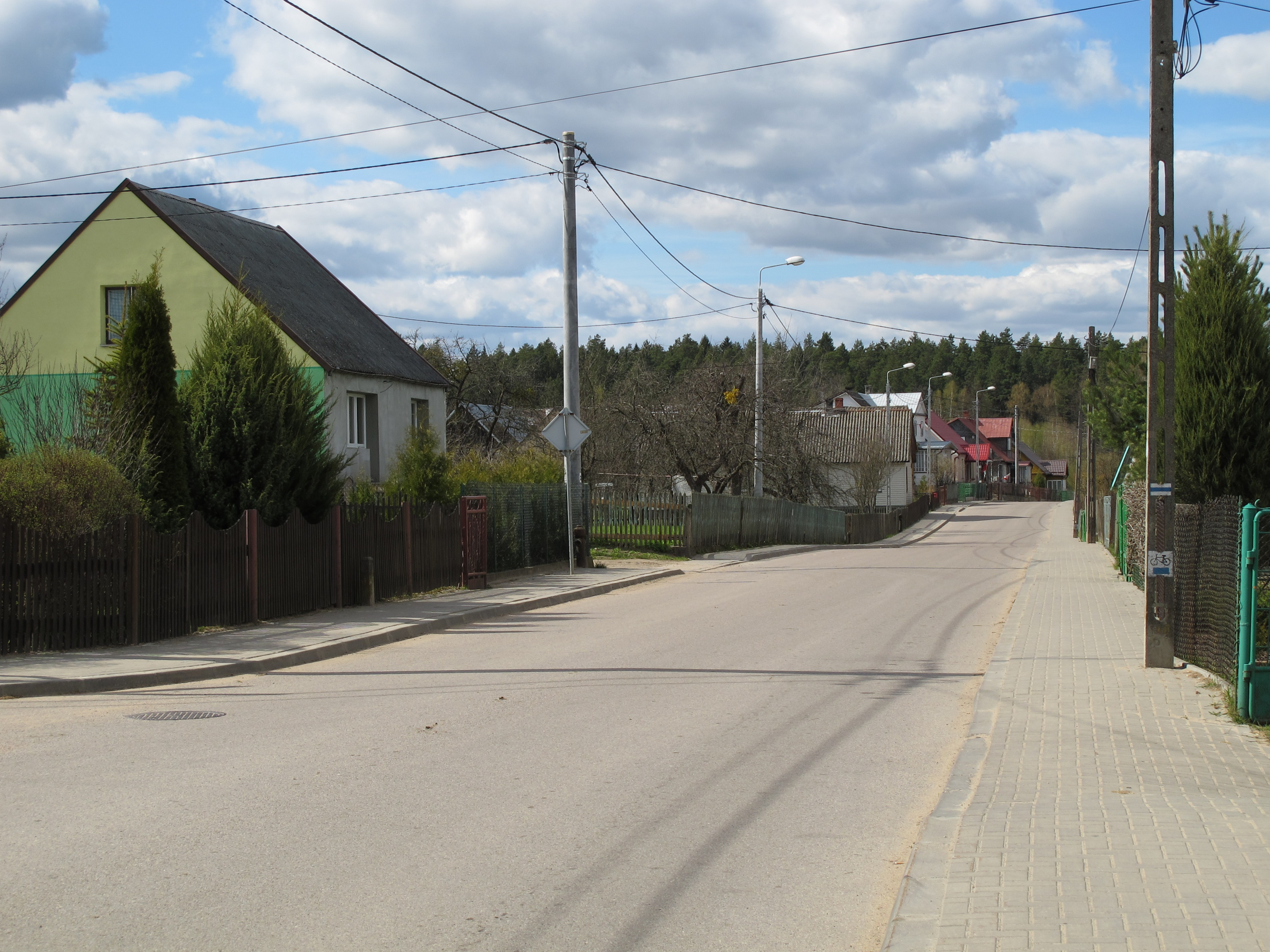

- Location within Poland
- Coordinates: 53°17′56″N 23°13′10″E
- Country: Poland
- Voivodeship: Podlaskie
- County: Białystok
- Gmina: Czarna Białostocka
- Population: 630

Czarna Wieś Kościelna [ˈt͡ʂarna ˈvjɛɕ kɔɕˈt͡ɕɛlna] is a village in the administrative district of Gmina Czarna Białostocka, within Białystok County, Podlaskie Voivodeship, in north-eastern Poland.
