= Podzamczysk =

- Settlement
- Location within Poland
- Coordinates: 53°21′56″N 23°10′55″E
- Country: Poland
- Voivodeship: Podlaskie
- County: Białystok
- Gmina: Czarna Białostocka

Podzamczysk [pɔˈd͡zamt͡ʂɨsk] is a settlement in the administrative district of Gmina Czarna Białostocka, within Białystok County, Podlaskie Voivodeship, in north-eastern Poland.
