= Klimki, Podlaskie Voivodeship =

Klimki
- Village
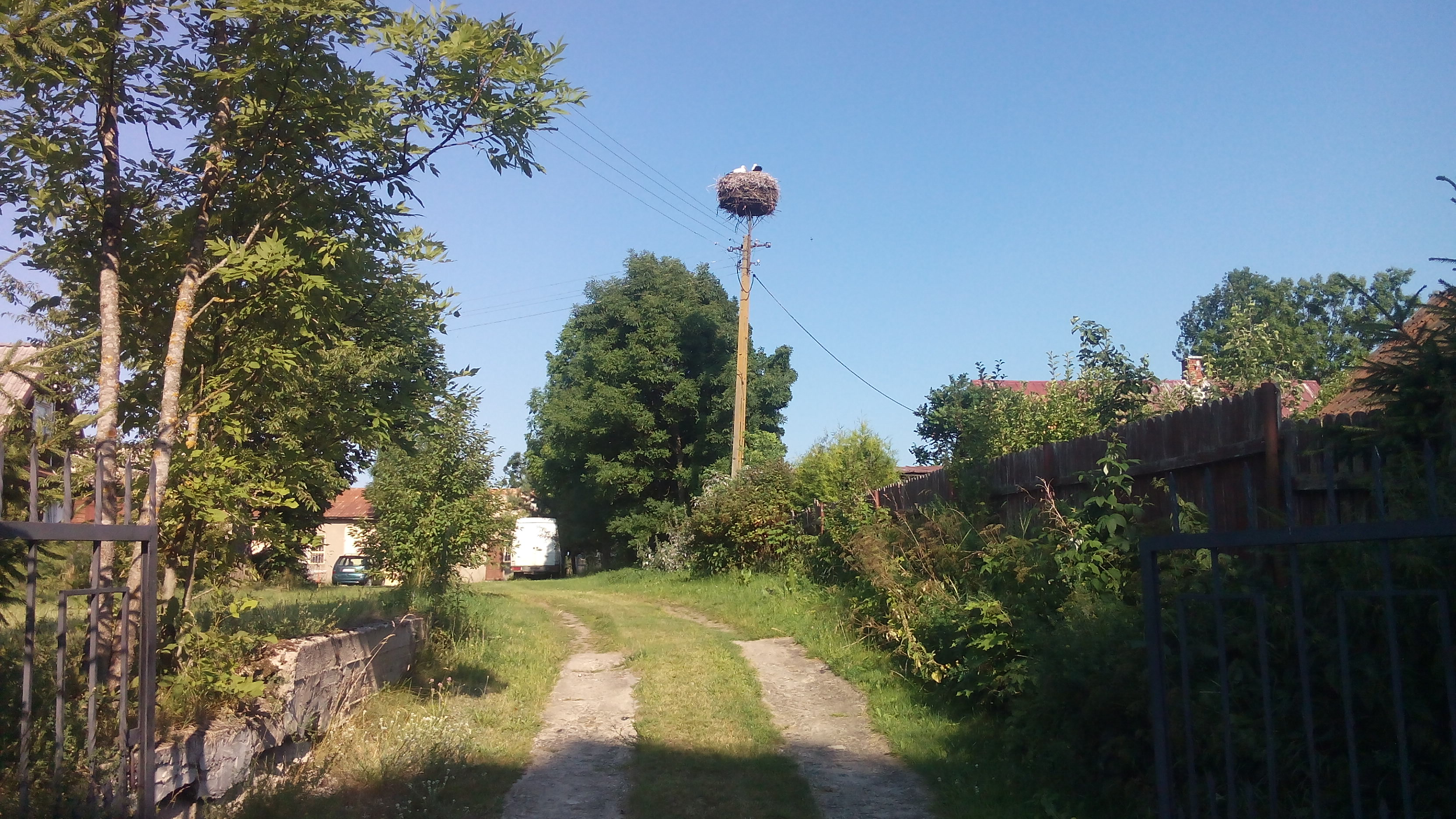

- Location within Poland
- Coordinates: 53°18′N 23°15′E
- Country: Poland
- Voivodeship: Podlaskie
- County: Białystok
- Gmina: Czarna Białostocka
- Population: 100

Klimki [ˈklimki] is a village in the administrative district of Gmina Czarna Białostocka, within Białystok County, Podlaskie Voivodeship, in north-eastern Poland.
