= Osierodek =

- Settlement
- Location within Poland
- Coordinates: 53°19′59″N 23°11′50″E
- Country: Poland
- Voivodeship: Podlaskie
- County: Białystok
- Gmina: Czarna Białostocka

Osierodek [ɔɕɛˈrɔdɛk] is a settlement in the administrative district of Gmina Czarna Białostocka, within Białystok County, Podlaskie Voivodeship, in north-eastern Poland.
