= Burczak, Gmina Czarna Białostocka =

Burczak
- Village
- Location within Poland
- Coordinates: 53°16′59″N 23°11′44″E
- Country: Poland
- Voivodeship: Podlaskie
- County: Białystok
- Gmina: Czarna Białostocka

Burczak (Polish pronunciation: [ˈburt͡ʂak]) is a village in the administrative district of Gmina Czarna Białostocka, within Białystok County, Podlaskie Voivodeship, in north-eastern Poland.
