= Karczmisko =

- Village
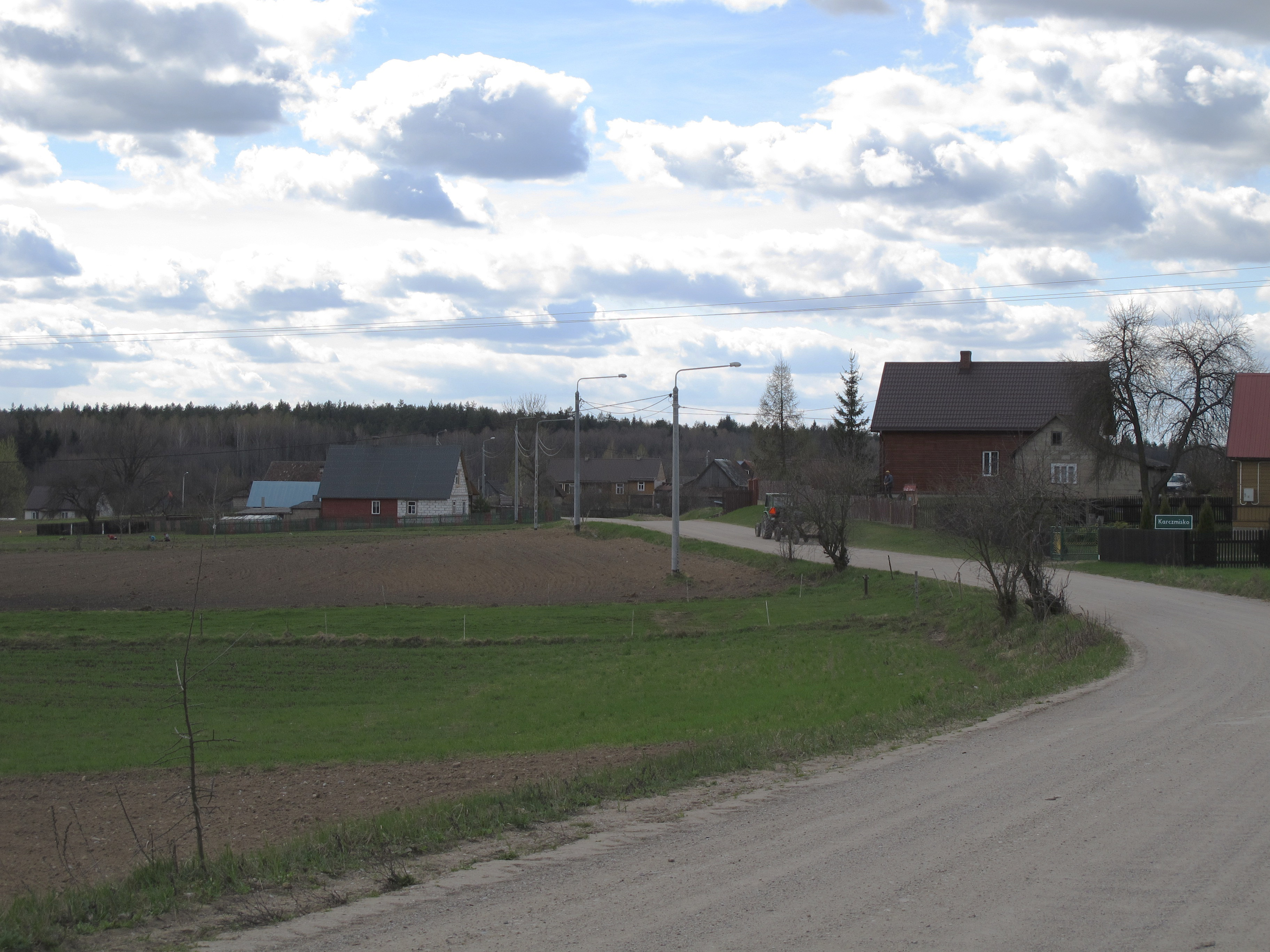

- Location within Poland
- Coordinates: 53°18′0″N 23°11′14″E
- Country: Poland
- Voivodeship: Podlaskie
- County: Białystok
- Gmina: Czarna Białostocka

Karczmisko [kart͡ʂˈmiskɔ] is a village in the administrative district of Gmina Czarna Białostocka, within Białystok County, Podlaskie Voivodeship, in north-eastern Poland.
