= Chmielnik, Podlaskie Voivodeship =

Chmielnik
- Village
- Location within Poland
- Coordinates: 53°19′51″N 23°11′13″E
- Country: Poland
- Voivodeship: Podlaskie
- County: Białystok
- Gmina: Czarna Białostocka

Chmielnik [ˈxmjɛlnik] is a village in the administrative district of Gmina Czarna Białostocka, within Białystok County, Podlaskie Voivodeship, in north-eastern Poland.
