= Kosmaty Borek =

- Village
- Location within Poland
- Coordinates: 53°19′N 23°12′E
- Country: Poland
- Voivodeship: Podlaskie
- County: Białystok
- Gmina: Czarna Białostocka
- Population: 120

Kosmaty Borek [kɔsˈmatɨ ˈbɔrɛk] is a village in the administrative district of Gmina Czarna Białostocka, within Białystok County, Podlaskie Voivodeship, in north-eastern Poland.
