= Hutki, Podlaskie Voivodeship =

Hutki
- Settlement
- Location within Poland
- Coordinates: 53°19′29″N 23°5′10″E
- Country: Poland
- Voivodeship: Podlaskie
- County: Białystok
- Gmina: Czarna Białostocka

Hutki [ˈxutki] is a settlement in the administrative district of Gmina Czarna Białostocka, within Białystok County, Podlaskie Voivodeship, in north-eastern Poland.
