= Ruda Rzeczka =

- Village
- Location within Poland
- Coordinates: 53°19′04″N 23°19′53″E
- Country: Poland
- Voivodeship: Podlaskie
- County: Białystok
- Gmina: Czarna Białostocka

Ruda Rzeczka [ˈruda ˈʐɛt͡ʂka] is a village in the administrative district of Gmina Czarna Białostocka, within Białystok County, Podlaskie Voivodeship, in north-eastern Poland.
