= Brzozówka Ziemiańska =

- Village
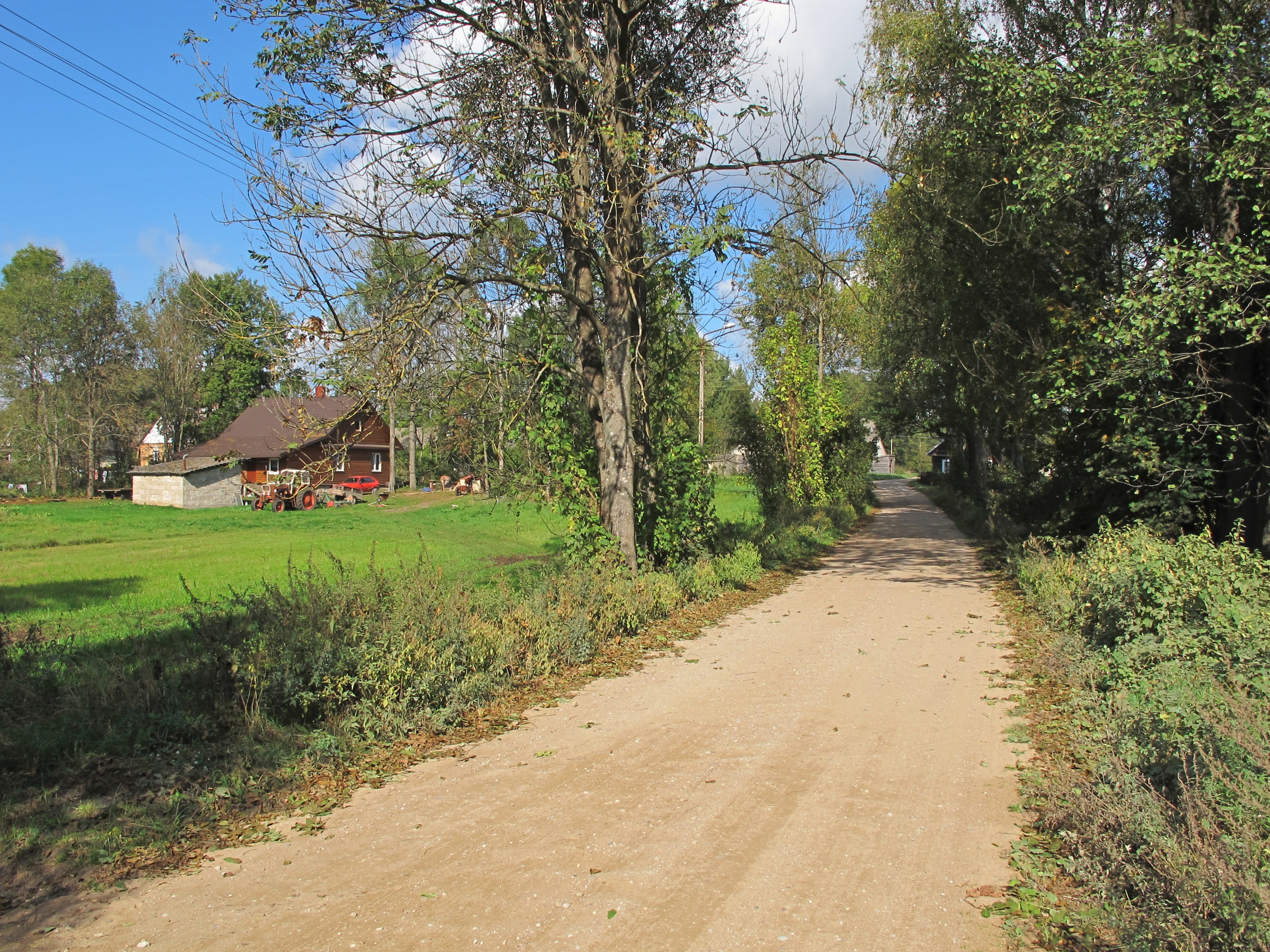

- Location within Poland
- Coordinates: 53°20′N 23°8′E
- Country: Poland
- Voivodeship: Podlaskie
- County: Białystok
- Gmina: Czarna Białostocka

Brzozówka Ziemiańska [bʐɔˈzufka ʑɛˈmjaɲska] is a village in the administrative district of Gmina Czarna Białostocka, within Białystok County, Podlaskie Voivodeship, in north-eastern Poland.
