= Czarna Białostocka =

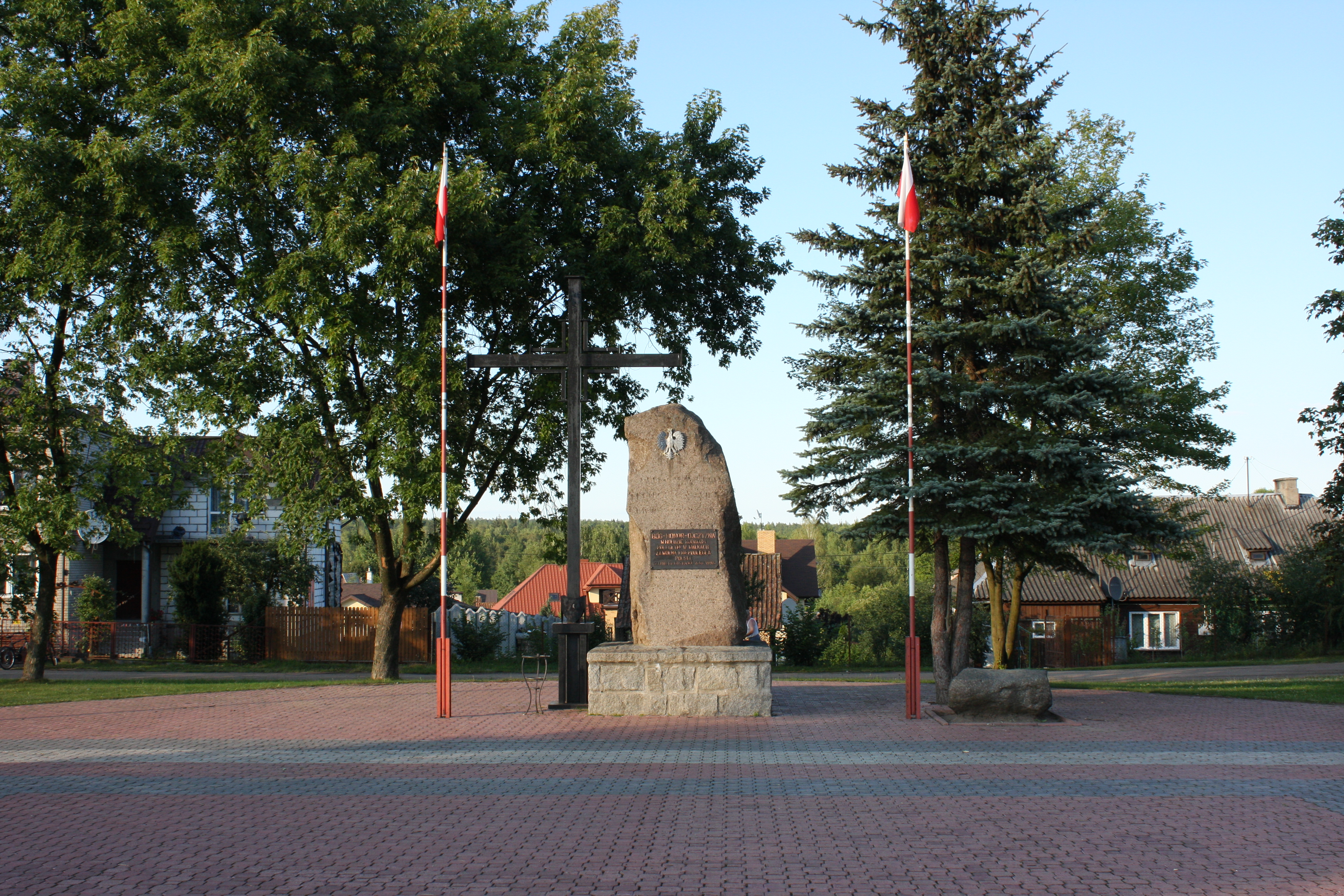
- Monument to Poles fallen in fights for independent Poland

- Coat of arms

- Location within Poland
- Coordinates: 53°18′N 23°17′E
- Country: Poland
- Voivodeship: Podlaskie
- County: Białystok
- Gmina: Czarna Białostocka
- Town rights: 1962

Government
  - Mayor: Jacek Chrulski

Area
  - Total: 14.28 km^{2} (5.51 sq mi)

Population (31 December 2021)
  - Total: 9,032
  - Density: 632.5/km^{2} (1,638/sq mi)
- Time zone: UTC+1 (CET)
  - Summer (DST): UTC+2 (CEST)
- Postal code: 16-020
- Area code: (+48) 85
- Vehicle registration: BIA
- Website: http://www.czarnabialostocka.pl/

Czarna Białostocka [ˈt͡ʂarna bʲawɔˈstɔt͡ska] is a town in north-eastern Poland. It is the seat of Gmina Czarna Białostocka, situated in Białystok County in the Podlaskie Voivodeship, having previously been in Białystok Voivodeship (1975-1998). As of December 2021, the town has a population of 9,032.

== Notable people ==
- Andrzej Jerzy Zglejszewski (born 1961) Catholic bishop in the United States.
