= Ogóły =

- Village
- Location within Poland
- Coordinates: 53°17′02″N 23°10′20″E
- Country: Poland
- Voivodeship: Podlaskie
- County: Białystok
- Gmina: Czarna Białostocka

Ogóły [ɔˈɡuwɨ] is a village in the administrative district of Gmina Czarna Białostocka, within Białystok County, Podlaskie Voivodeship, in north-eastern Poland.
