= Białystok Prison =

Prison in Białystok, Poland

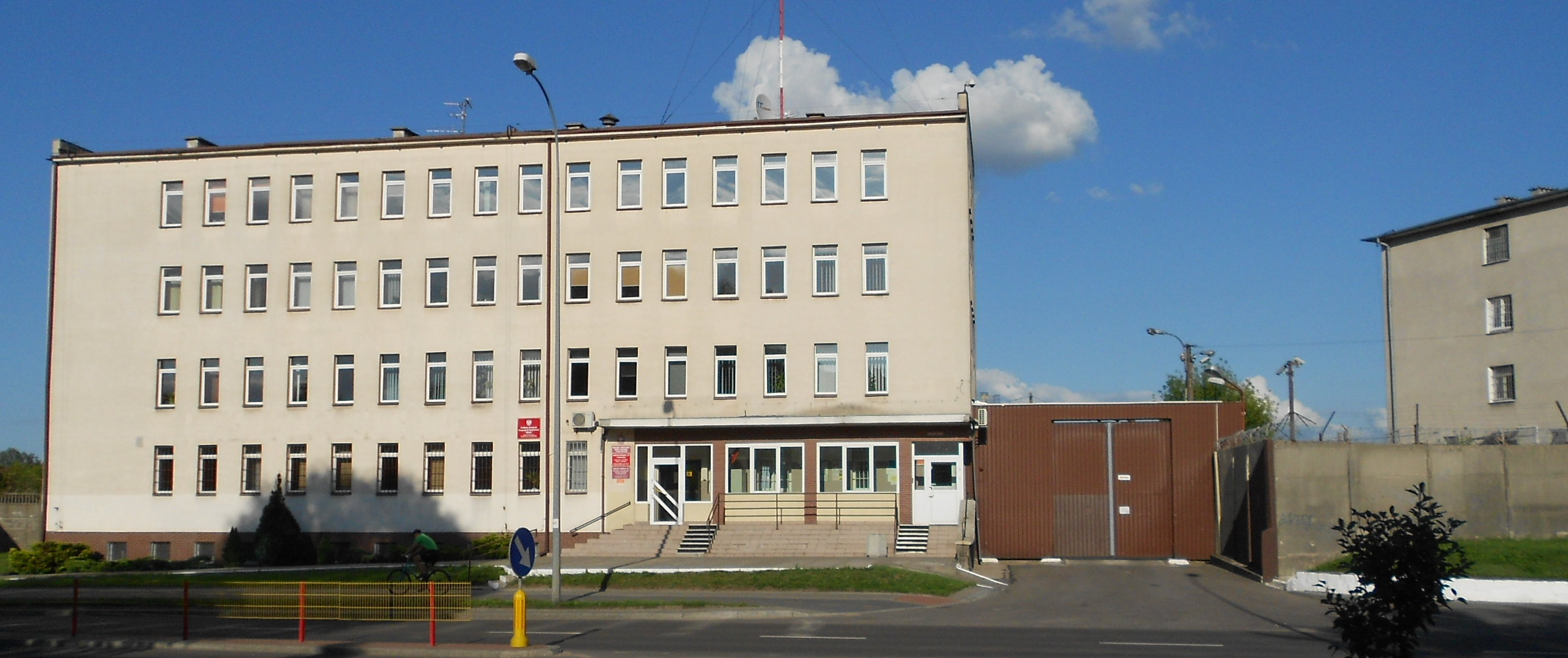
- Interactive map of Białystok Prison
- Location: Młodych District, Białystok, Poland; 53°07′36″N 23°07′03″E
- Status: Active
- Opened: ~1955
- Managed by: Polish Prison Service

The Białystok Prison (Polish: Zakład Karny w Białymstoku) is a prison in Hetmańska street, Młodych District of Białystok, capital of Podlaskie Voivodeship. The prison also houses the seat of the District Inspectorate of the Prison Service in Białystok and the Occupational Health Care Facility in Białystok.

== History ==
Around the mid-1950s, barracks were built in the prison's location where prisoners from the Białystok Prison on Kopernika Street were held. They worked on the premises as well as outside of it. In 1961, brick buildings were built and the Prisoner Labor Sub-Center at the Central Prison in Białystok operated. Since then it is used as a prison. The prison received its current status on 1st of July 1996.
