= Łazarz, Podlaskie Voivodeship =

Łazarz
- Settlement
- Location within Poland
- Coordinates: 53°17′04″N 23°11′04″E
- Country: Poland
- Voivodeship: Podlaskie
- County: Białystok
- Gmina: Czarna Białostocka

Łazarz [ˈwazaʂ] is a settlement in the administrative district of Gmina Czarna Białostocka, within Białystok County, Podlaskie Voivodeship, in north-eastern Poland.
