= Dworzysk, Białystok County =

Dworzysk
- Settlement
- Location within Poland
- Coordinates: 53°17′4.98″N 23°24′33.45″E
- Country: Poland
- Voivodeship: Podlaskie
- County: Białystok
- Gmina: Czarna Białostocka

Dworzysk [ˈdvɔʐɨsk] is a settlement in the administrative district of Gmina Czarna Białostocka, within Białystok County, Podlaskie Voivodeship, in north-eastern Poland.
