= Jacques Rogozinski =

Mexican economist

Jacques Rogozinski Schtulman
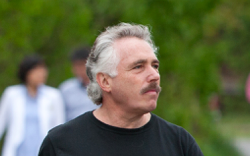
- Jacques Rogozinski

General Director Development Banking Institution Nafinsa
- In office 6 December 2012 – December 2018
- Preceded by: Héctor Rangel Domene
- Succeeded by: Eugenio Nájera Solórzano

Chief Executive Officer of the Inter-American Investment Corporation
- In office January 2000 – December 2012

Personal details
- Born: Paris, France
- Party: None
- Spouse: Janet Lynn Williams Metcalfe
- Children: Helena Anne Rogozinski Jaime Aaron Rogozinski Joel David Rogozinski
- Parent: Gustavo Rogozinski Najman Helena Schtulman Lempert
- Education: Instituto Tecnológico Autónomo de México (BBA); University of Colorado Boulder (PHD)
- Profession: Economist
- Website: www.mitosymentadas.com

Jacques Rogozinski Schtulman is an economist, public official and Mexican writer, regular columnist in Mexican newspapers El Financiero and Milenio.

His last public office was as General Director of Development Banking Institution Nafinsa (Nacional Financiera); he was also President of the Board of Directors of the Latin American Association of Development Financing Institutions.

During his term as general director of Nacional Financiera, the first Green and Social Bond in Latin America was issued in Mexican pesos in the Mexican Stock Market based on the Green Bond Principles, Climate bonds standards and the Social Bond Principles 2017 of the International Capital Market Association (June 2017).

During the administration of President Carlos Salinas de Gortari (1988-1994) he played a key role in the process of privatization of public companies as Head of the Office of Disincorporation of the Secretariat of Finance and Public Credit, which was responsible for coordinating the disincorporation of airlines, ports, mines (most sectors except the privatization of Mexican banking, in which he did not participate) and the sales of Mexican Telephony.

== Biography ==
He arrived in Mexico with a refugee status from United Nations for World War II (laissez-passer) the same status as his parents. He was born in Paris-France, on 8 October 1950. His parents are of Polish descent, survivors of Nazi concentration camps during the Holocaust in World War II. They emigrated to Mexico when he was 10 months old and obtained Mexican nationality through the naturalization process at age 31. The only nationality that he has ever had has been the Mexican nationality, in France a person is not granted the nationality by birth.

Throughout his academic career he received several awards, the first one at a very young age in 1974, as the "Best Student in Mexico" granted by the President of Mexico Luis Echeverria.

He holds a degree in business administration from the Instituto Tecnológico Autónomo de México (1974) and a master's degree and PhD in economics from the University of Colorado Boulder.

== Trajectory as public servant ==
He began his career as public servant in 1979, with experience in various positions in the field of economics and finance, including:

- Institute for Deposit of Securities, Director of Administration and Monitoring. (1979-1982)
- Nacional Lottery, General Coordinator of Administration and Systems, responsible for modernization policies. (1982-1988)
- Secretariat of Planning and Budget, Advisor to the Secretary. (1988)
- Secretariat of Finance and Public Credit, Head of the Disincorporation Unit (1989 - 1992)
- General Director of the National Bank of Public Works (1992-1994)
- General Director of the National Development Trust for Tourism Development (Fonatur) (1994-1995)
- Development Banking Institution Nafinsa, General Director (2012 - 2018)

In the international arena, he has experience as a high level official both in the Inter - American Development Bank and the Inter - American Investment Corporation where he spent more than 15 years (1996 - 2012), in the following positions:

- Advisor on private sector matters, Inter-American Development Bank. (1996-1999)
- Deputy general manager of the Inter-American Investment Corporation (1999)
- General manager of the Inter-American Investment Corporation (2000-2012)

It is particularly relevant that, during his term as general manager of the Inter-American Investment Corporation he anticipated the 2008 financial crisis and its affect on asset-backed securities in the United States, and gradually eliminated them from the portfolio. This allowed the Inter-American Investment Corporation to pass through the crisis unscathed while during the same period, the Inter-American Development Bank recorded losses in excess of 1 trillion dollars.

== Publications ==
- Rogozinski, Jacques; Glover, Fred (1980). Resort Development: A Network-Related Model for Optimizing Sites And Visits. Univ Colorado Business Research Div.
- Rogozinski, Jacques (1997). La privatización en México: razones e impactos (1. ed.). México, D.F.: Trillas. ISBN 9789682455513.
- Rogozinski, Jacques (1998). High Price for Change: Privatization in Mexico. Washington, D.C.: ISBN 9781886938434
- Rogozinski, Jacques (2012). Mitos y mentadas de la economia mexicana. Por que crece poco un pais hecho a la medida del paladar norteamericano. Mexico, D.F.: ISBN 9786073111539
- Rogozinski, Jacques (2019). Y ahora pa' dónde. Reflexiones sobre cultura y cambio en un mundo cambiante. México, D.F. ISBN 9786073175463

== Recognition ==
- Global Leader of Tomorrow from the World Economic Forum, 1993
- Priyadarshini Academy Indian Award 2012
- Recognition award from the Jewish Cultural Institute Mexico-Israel, September 2018
