= Rogoziński Most =

- Settlement
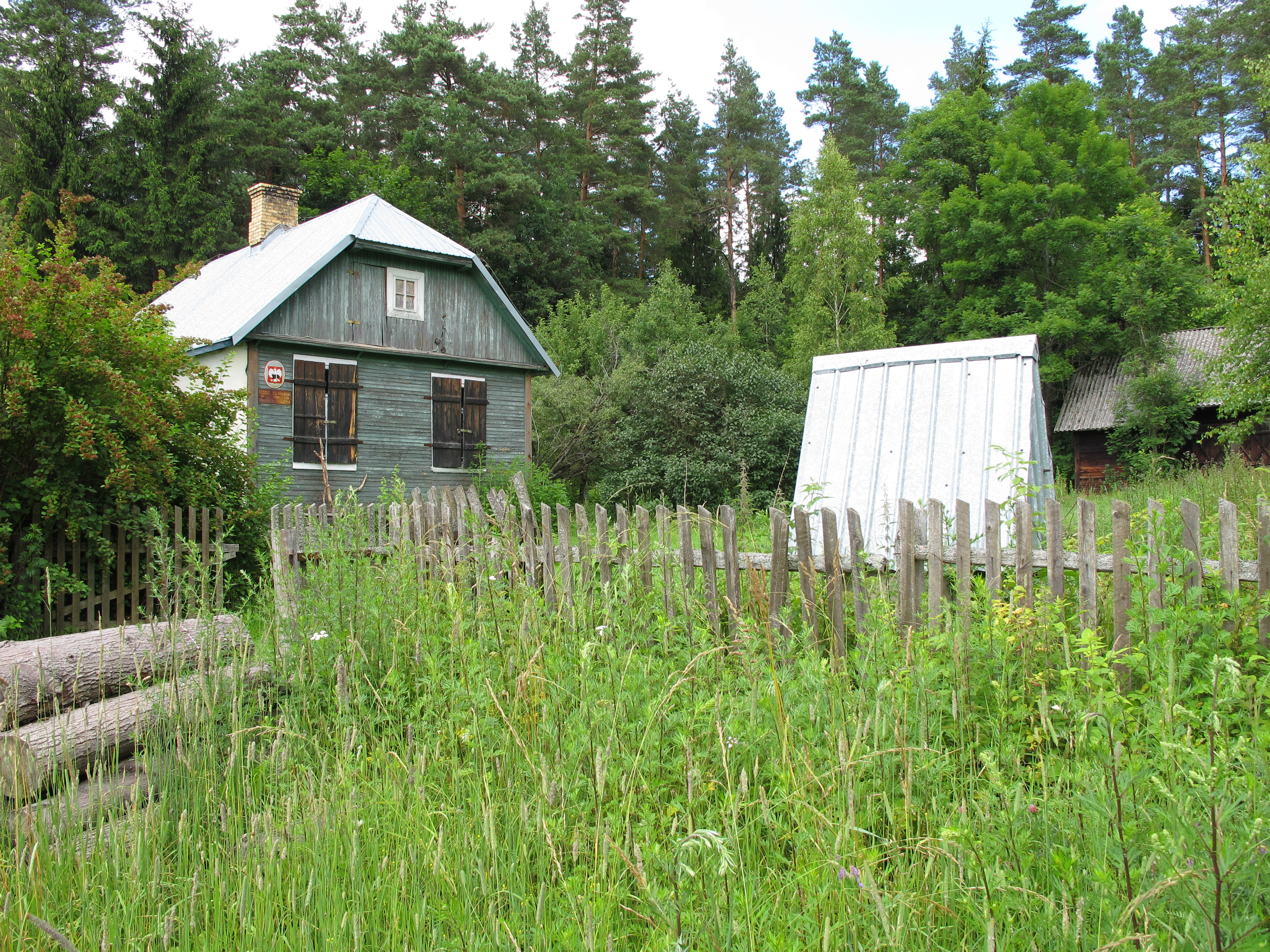

- Location within Poland
- Coordinates: 53°19′54″N 23°19′23″E
- Country: Poland
- Voivodeship: Podlaskie
- County: Białystok
- Gmina: Czarna Białostocka

Rogoziński Most [rɔɡɔˈʑiɲski ˈmɔst] is a settlement in the administrative district of Gmina Czarna Białostocka, within Białystok County, Podlaskie Voivodeship, in north-eastern Poland.
