= Złotoria, Gmina Czarna Białostocka =

Złotoria
- Settlement
- Location within Poland
- Coordinates: 53°17′15″N 23°15′45″E
- Country: Poland
- Voivodeship: Podlaskie
- County: Białystok
- Gmina: Czarna Białostocka

Złotoria [zwɔˈtɔrja] is a settlement in the administrative district of Gmina Czarna Białostocka, within Białystok County, Podlaskie Voivodeship, in north-eastern Poland.
